= Moulin Rouge: La Goulue =

Lithograph poster by Henri de Toulouse-Lautrec

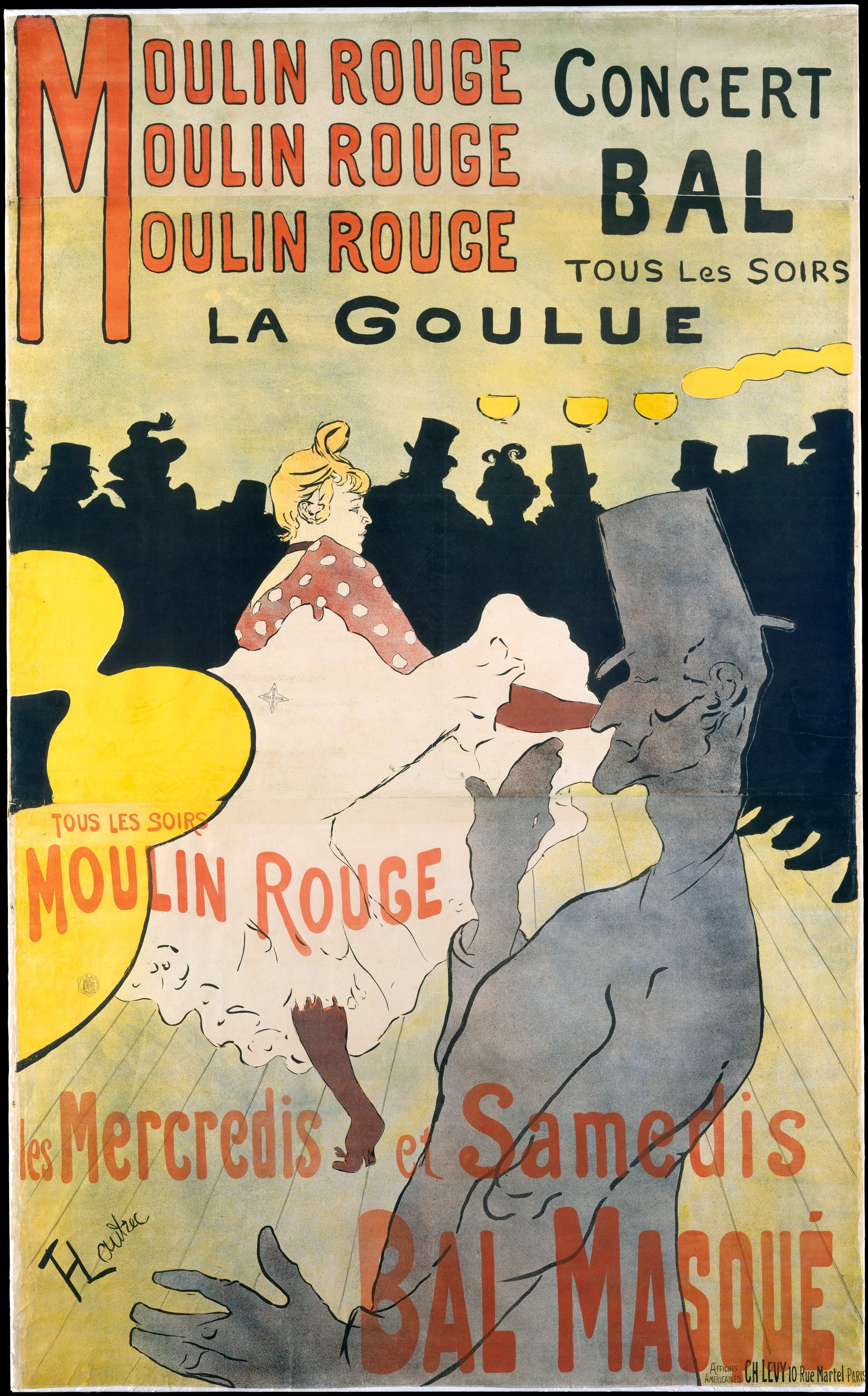
- Artist: Henri de Toulouse-Lautrec
- Year: 1891
- Type: Lithograph
- Dimensions: 170 cm × 118.7 cm (67 in × 46.75 in)

Moulin Rouge: La Goulue is a poster by French artist Henri de Toulouse-Lautrec. It is a colour lithograph from 1891, probably printed in about 3,000 copies, advertising the famous dancers La Goulue and "No-Bones" Valentin, and the new Paris dance hall Moulin Rouge. Although most examples were pasted as advertising posters and lost, surviving examples are in the collection of the Indianapolis Museum of Art and many other institutions.

== Description ==
Moulin Rouge: La Goulue is a bold, four-color lithograph depicting the famous cancan dancer La Goulue and her flexible partner Valentin le Désossé made to advertise the popular French club, Moulin Rouge. Their audience is reduced to silhouettes in order to focus attention on the performers and evoke the Japanese art then in vogue. The triple repetition of the club's name draws the focus down to the central figure of the poster, La Goulue herself. The stark white of her petticoats, depicted with just a few lines on the white paper, epitomizes Toulouse-Lautrec's boldly simplistic style, a sharp break from the text-heavy posters of the day.

== Historical information ==
The Moulin Rouge had opened two years earlier, in 1889, and instantly established itself as a Montmartre landmark. It was renowned for the elasticity of its young dancers, both physically and morally; police officers made periodic checks to ensure that they were all wearing underwear. However, the poster by Jules Chéret advertising the club's delights was relatively subdued, so the director Charles Zidler hired the young (only 27 years old) Toulouse-Lautrec to create a more vibrant poster.

Although Moulin Rouge: La Goulue was Toulouse-Lautrec's first attempt at lithography, such was his grasp of the medium's possibilities that it was an immediate sensation. 3000 copies spread around Paris captivated the public with their eye-catching design, bold colors, and innovative, Japanese-inspired use of silhouettes. Cannily focusing on the dancer La Goulue, whose energetic kicks and insatiable appetites had made her famous, gave the poster an additional boost in popularity. But it was Toulouse-Lautrec's own artistic skill that made him a star overnight.

== See also ==
- Post-Impressionism
- At the Moulin Rouge
