= Bill Goodson =

American dancer and choreographer

Bill Goodson, also known as Billy Goodson, is an American dancer and choreographer. Emerging from the Los Angeles club and street-dance scene in the 1970s, he became associated with waacking through his work with Diana Ross. His choreography credits include the films Breakin' 2: Electric Boogaloo and Girls Just Want to Have Fun, Italian television productions and the Moulin Rouge revues Formidable and Féerie.

== Early life ==
Goodson was born in Los Angeles and grew up in Synanon, a California rehabilitation community. He left the organization in 1976 at the age of 19 and subsequently pursued a dance career in California.

Goodson and his mother later appeared in the HBO documentary series The Synanon Fix, discussing their experiences in the organization. He described his childhood there as generally positive while also criticizing the organization's use of adult therapeutic methods on children.

== Career ==
Goodson began dancing in the 1970s as a club and street dancer. Early in his career, he performed as a dancer with Diana Ross. For Ross, he cast and choreographed waacking pioneers for a tour and an HBO-televised concert at Caesars Palace. The New York Public Library identified him as an important figure in the history of waacking, particularly through his collaboration with Ross.

Goodson appeared with Michael Jackson in the music video for "Beat It". He subsequently accompanied Jackson on tour. As a choreographer, he worked with Ross, Jasmine Guy, Stevie Wonder, Gloria Estefan and Renato Zero. His other collaborators included Paula Abdul.

Goodson's early film credits included work as assistant choreographer on Roller Boogie in 1979. In 1984, he incorporated waacking into his choreography for Breakin' 2: Electric Boogaloo. The following year, he choreographed Tomboy and The Jewel of the Nile, receiving credit as Billy Goodson on the latter film. He also provided additional choreography for the audition scene in Girls Just Want to Have Fun.

By 1988, Goodson was working with the Moulin Rouge in Paris. He choreographed its centenary revue Formidable, which opened on 20 February 1988 and ran until 14 November 1999.

By 1989, Goodson was working as a jazz dancer in Los Angeles and teaching his style of jazz at the Dancer's Workshop of San Diego. He also taught at Balletakademien in Stockholm and Broadway Dance Center in Tokyo.

At the 1999 Los Angeles Dance Invitational, Goodson presented a contemporary-jazz work performed by an ensemble of twelve women. Reviewing the event, Jennifer Fisher of the Los Angeles Times called the work "another gem" and praised the dancers' elegant and forceful performance.

Later in 1999, Goodson choreographed Féerie, which opened on 23 December. The production featured sixty female dancers and seventeen sets and incorporated rap rhythms. Le Monde praised the production as modern and energetic while retaining the elegance, humour and historical awareness of traditional music hall. In 2002, the newspaper described Goodson as the American choreographer then overseeing the venue's stage presentation. In 2019, The Guardian documented the revue's dancers attending their annual rehearsal with Goodson.

Goodson's television work in Italy included the programs Torno sabato, Il ballo delle debuttanti and Chiambretti Night. His Italian stage work included productions of Hairspray during the 2008–2009 season, La Cage aux Folles in 2012 and The Full Monty in 2013, each directed and adapted by Massimo Romeo Piparo.

In 2017, Goodson joined the seventeenth season of Amici di Maria De Filippi as a dance teacher.
