= La Goulue =

French can-can dancer (1866–1929)

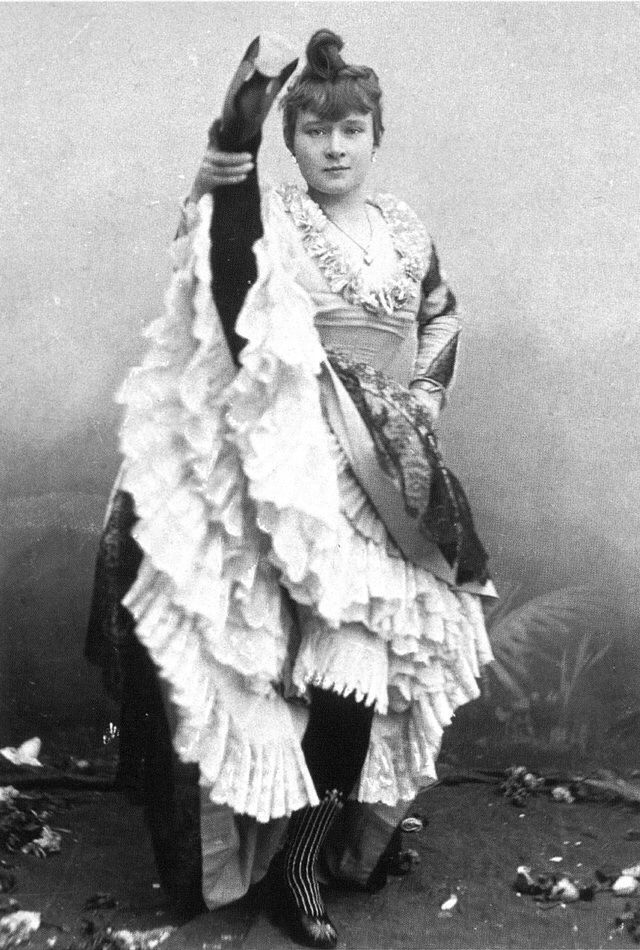
- Born: Louise Weber; 12 July 1866; Clichy, Hauts-de-Seine, France
- Died: 29 January 1929 (aged 62); Paris, France
- Resting place: Cimitière de Montmartre; 48°53′16″N 2°19′49″E
- Other name: The Queen of Montmartre
- Occupation: Dancer
- Years active: 1882–1928
- Employer: Moulin Rouge

La Goulue (French pronunciation: [la guly], meaning The Glutton), was the stage name of Louise Weber (12 July 1866 – 29 January 1929), a French can-can dancer who was a star of the Moulin Rouge, a popular cabaret in the Pigalle district of Paris, near Montmartre. Weber became known as La Goulue because as an adolescent, she was known for guzzling cabaret patrons' drinks while dancing. She also was referred to as the Queen of Montmartre.

== Childhood ==
Very little is known about her early childhood, but it is believed that Louise Weber was born into a Jewish family from Alsace that eventually moved to Clichy, Hauts-de-Seine, near Paris. Her mother worked in a laundry. As an impoverished young girl who loved to dance, Weber is said to have enjoyed dressing up in laundry customers' expensive clothing and pretending to be a glamorous star on a great stage. At age 16, she was working with her mother in the laundry, but behind her mother's back began sneaking off to a dance hall dressed in a customer's "borrowed" dress.

== Early career ==
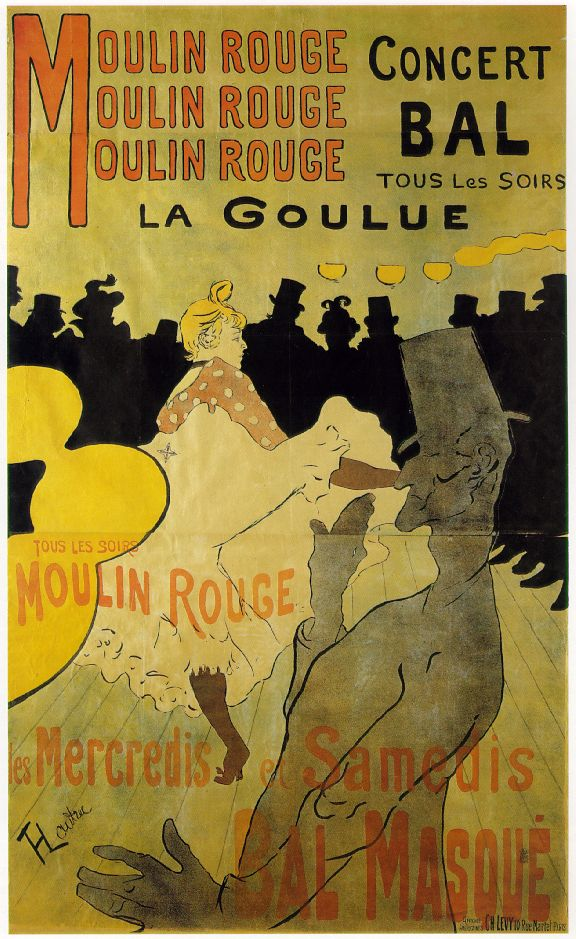
Moulin Rouge: La Goulue, a poster highlighting Louise Weber's work at the Moulin Rouge, by Henri de Toulouse-Lautrec, 1891

Dancing at small clubs around Paris, Weber quickly became a popular personality, liked for both her dancing skills and her charming, audacious behavior. In her routine, she would tease the male audience by swirling her raised dress to reveal the heart embroidered on her knickers and would do a high kick while flipping off a man's hat with her toe. Because of her frequent habit of picking up a customer's glass and quickly downing its contents while dancing past his table, she was affectionately nicknamed La Goulue (The Glutton). Eventually she met the Montmartre painter Pierre-Auguste Renoir, who introduced her to a group of models who earned extra money posing for the community's artists and photographers. Achille Delmaet, husband of Marie Juliette Louvet, would later find fame as the photographer who had taken many nude photographs of La Goulue.

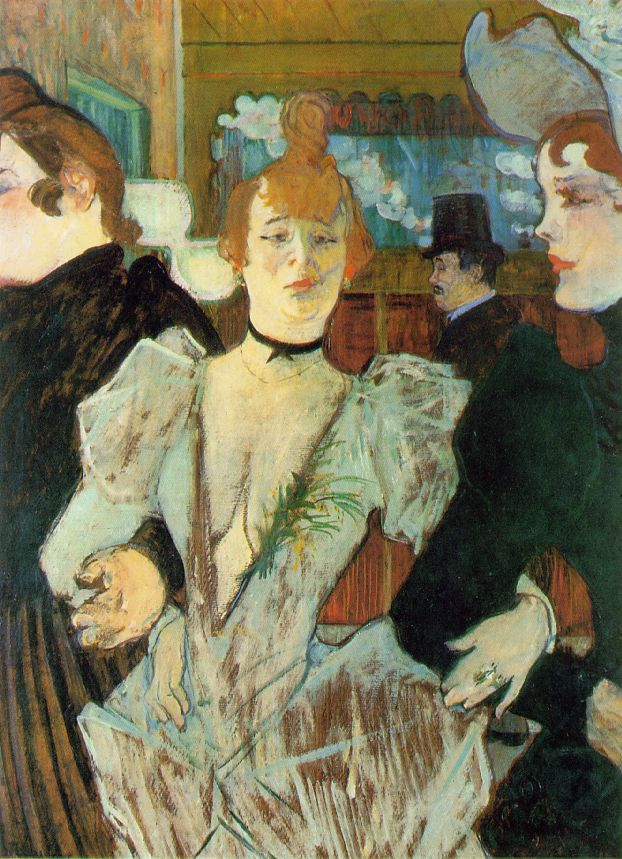
Henri Toulouse-Lautrec: La Goulue arriving at the Moulin Rouge (1892)

== Star of the Moulin Rouge ==
Louise Weber was taken under the wing of Jacques Renaudin (1843–1907), a wine merchant who danced in his spare time under the stage name Valentin le Désossé. They danced at the Moulin Rouge in Montmartre when it first opened, performing an early form of the cancan known as the chahut. The two were instant stars. Booked as a permanent headliner, La Goulue became synonymous with the can-can and the Moulin Rouge nightclub. The toast of Paris and the highest paid entertainer of her day, she became one of the favorite subjects for Henri de Toulouse-Lautrec, immortalized by his portraits and posters of her dancing at the Moulin Rouge. Her best friend was La Môme Fromage (The Cheesy Girl), another famous cancan dancer at the Moulin Rouge. They were so close that people called them sisters.

== Decline ==
Having achieved both fame and fortune, Weber decided to part company with the Moulin Rouge in 1895 and strike out on her own. She invested a considerable amount of money into a show that travelled the country as part of a large fair; but her fans who had lined up to buy tickets at the Moulin Rouge did not take to the new setting, and her business venture turned into a dismal failure. Following the closure of her show, La Goulue disappeared from the public eye. Suffering from depression, she drank heavily and dissipated the small fortune she had accrued while dancing.

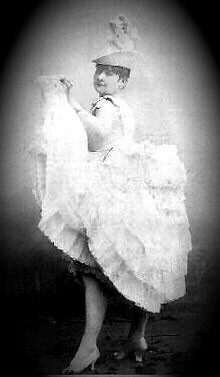

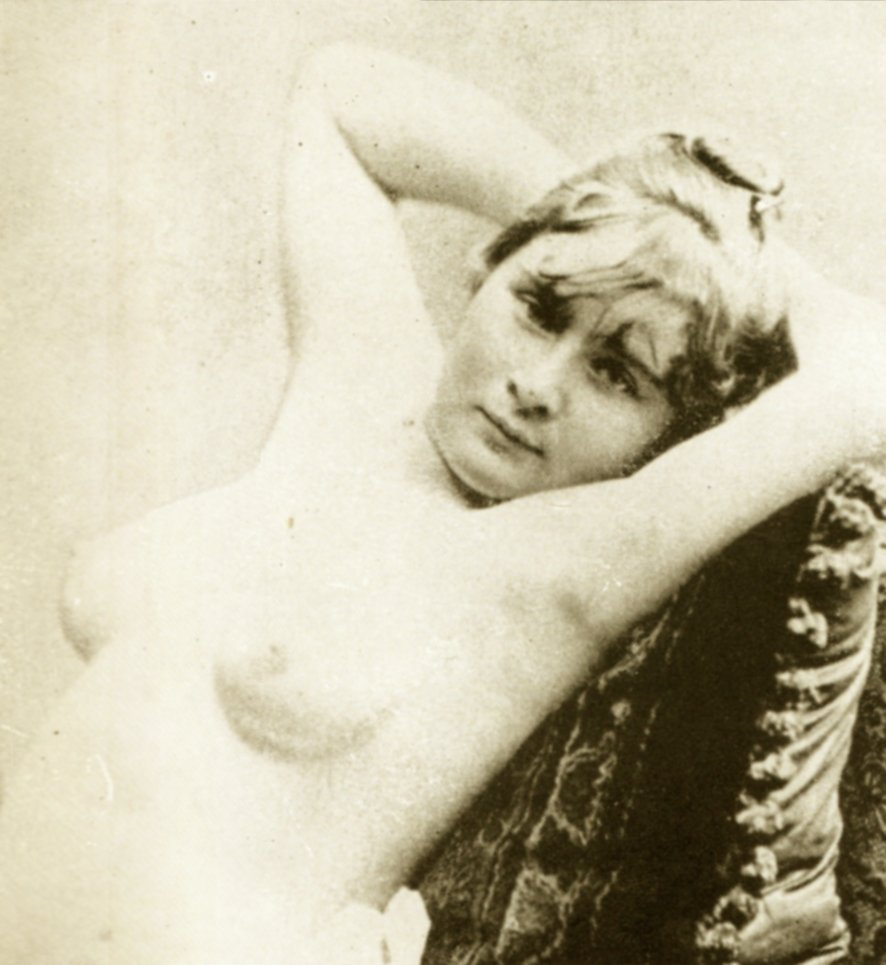
1885

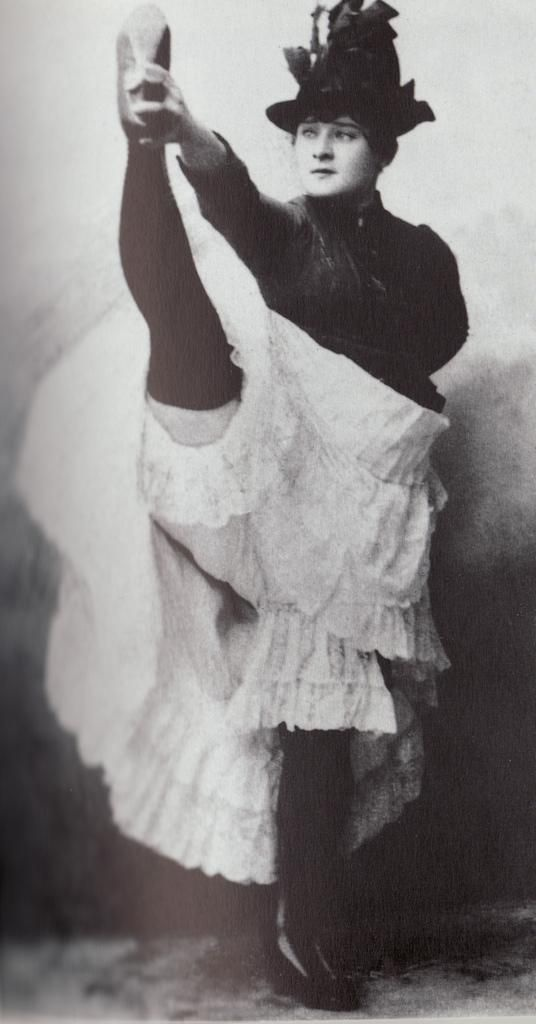

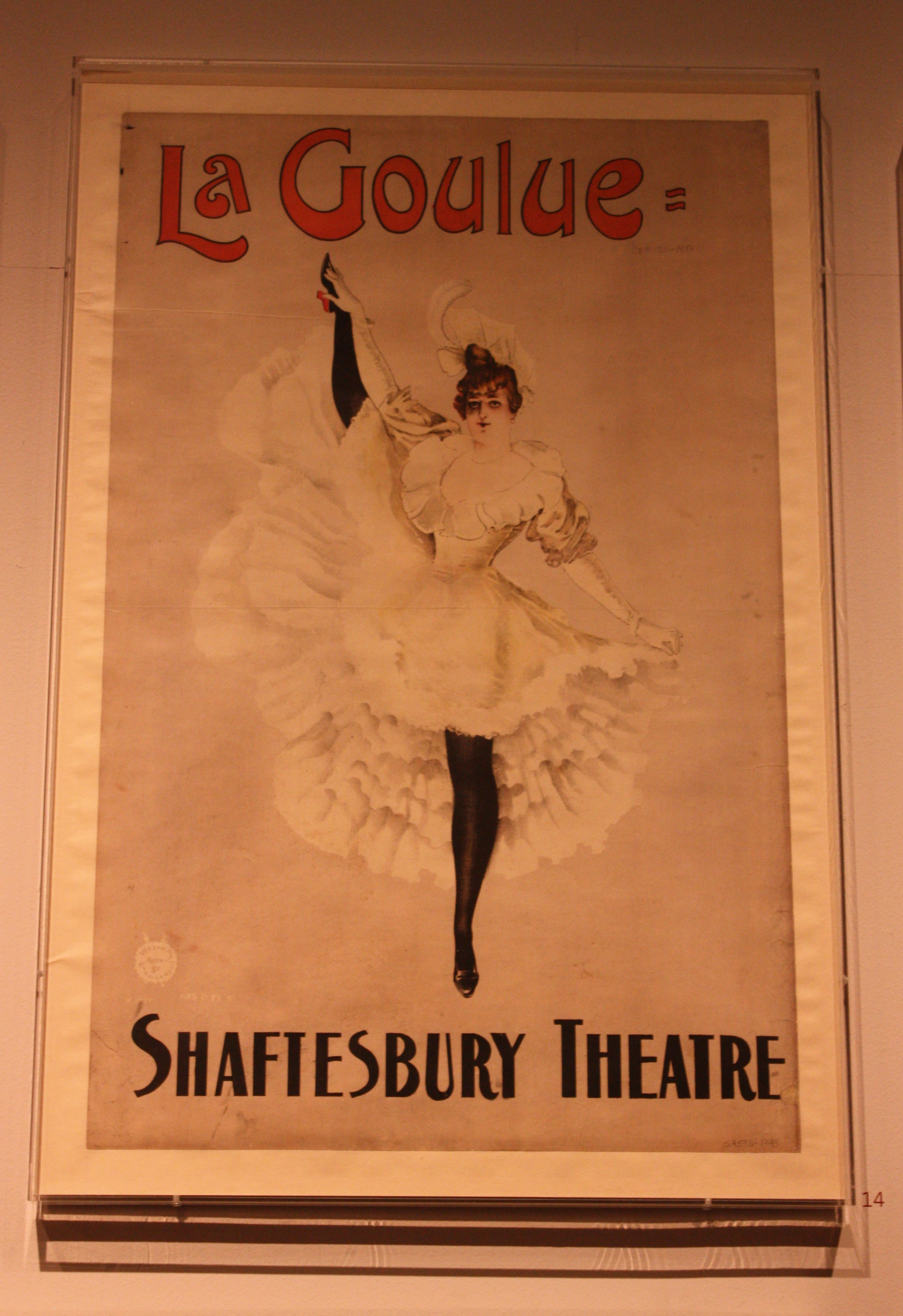
1894

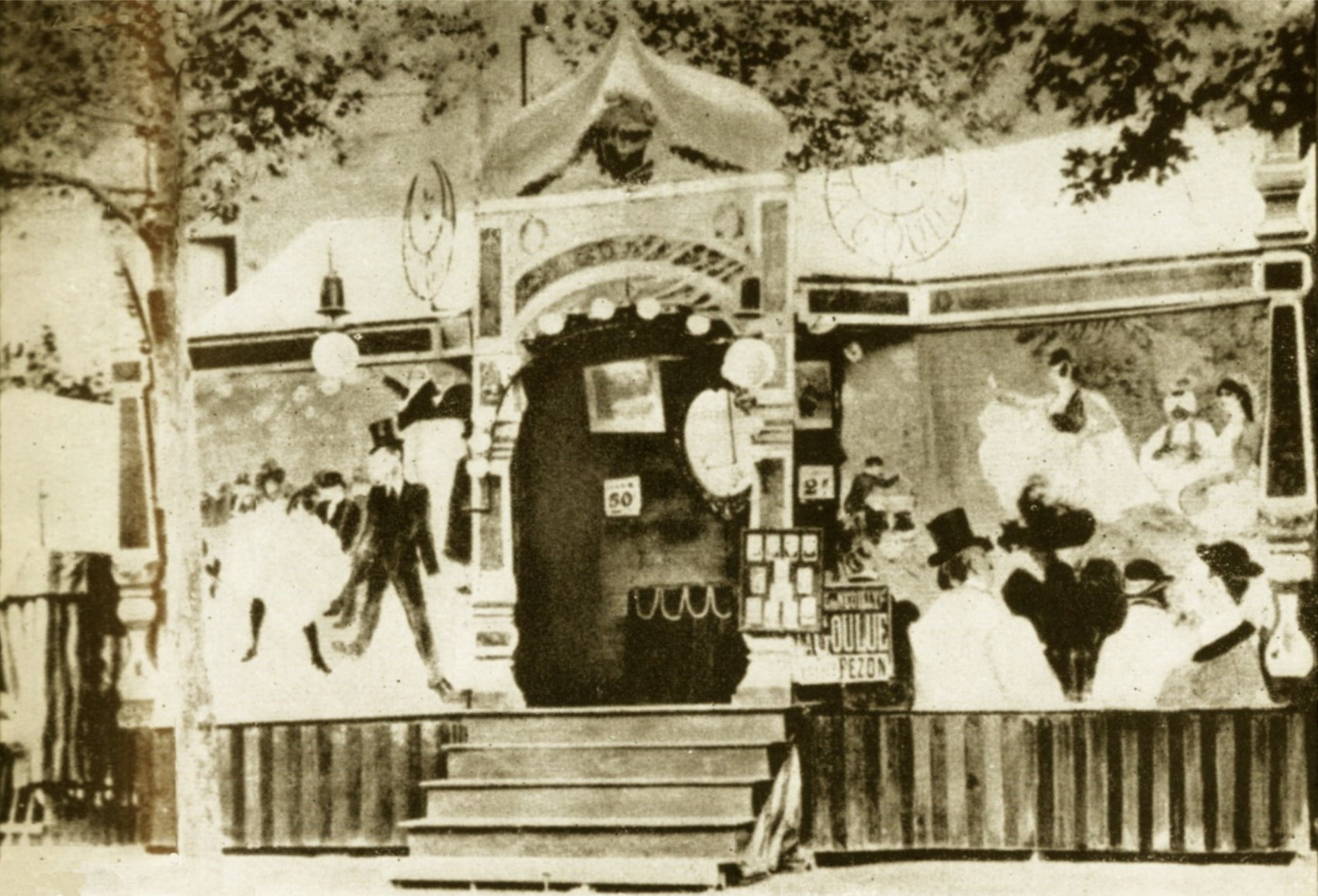
1895 show

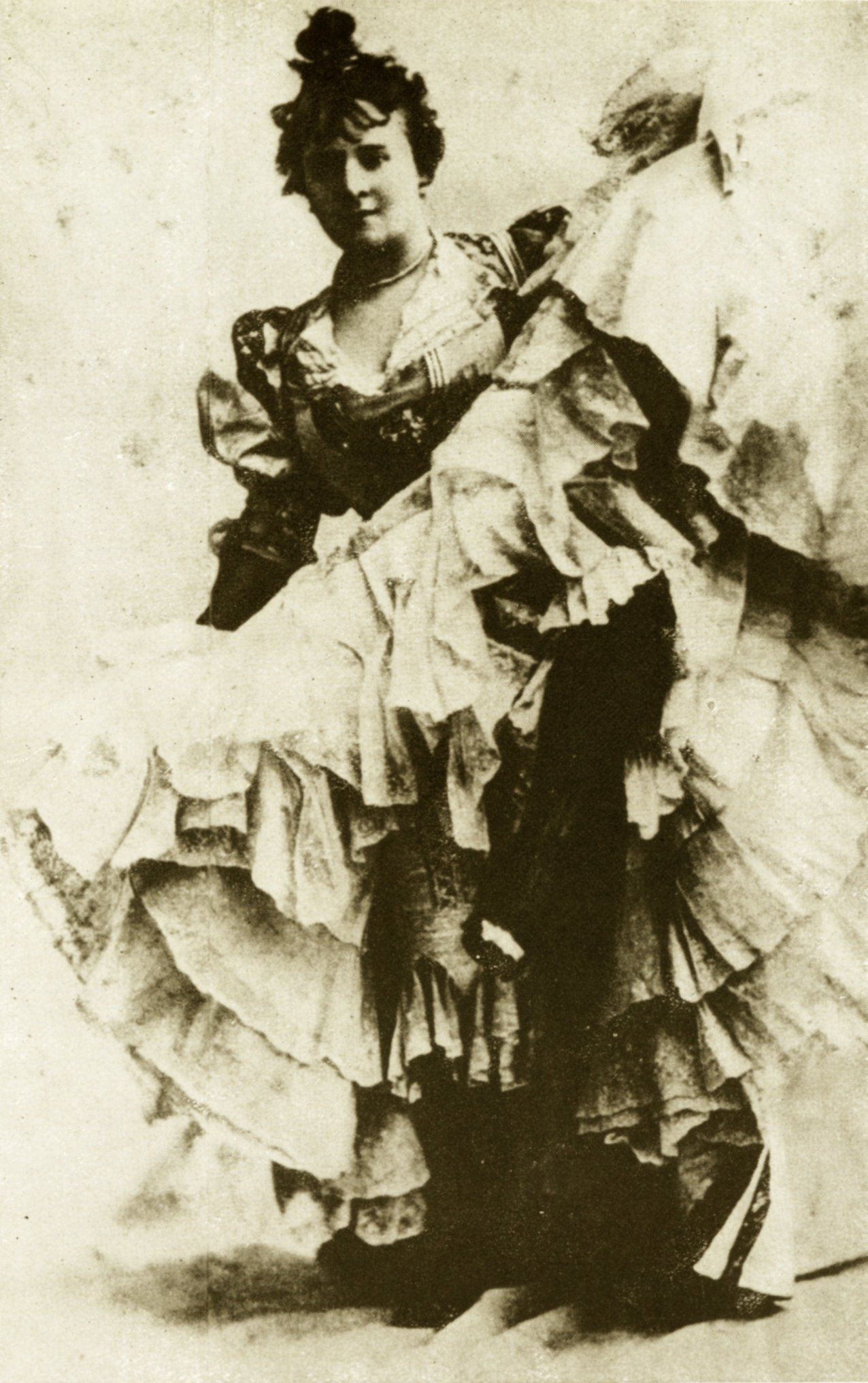

Alcoholic and destitute, La Goulue returned to Montmartre in 1928. She eked out a living selling peanuts, cigarettes, and matches on a street corner near the Moulin Rouge; few recognized the severely overweight and haggard former Queen of Montmartre. She died a year later at age 62 in the 10th arrondissement of Paris and was buried in the Cimetière de Pantin in the Paris suburb of Pantin, but later her remains were transferred to the Cimetière de Montmartre.

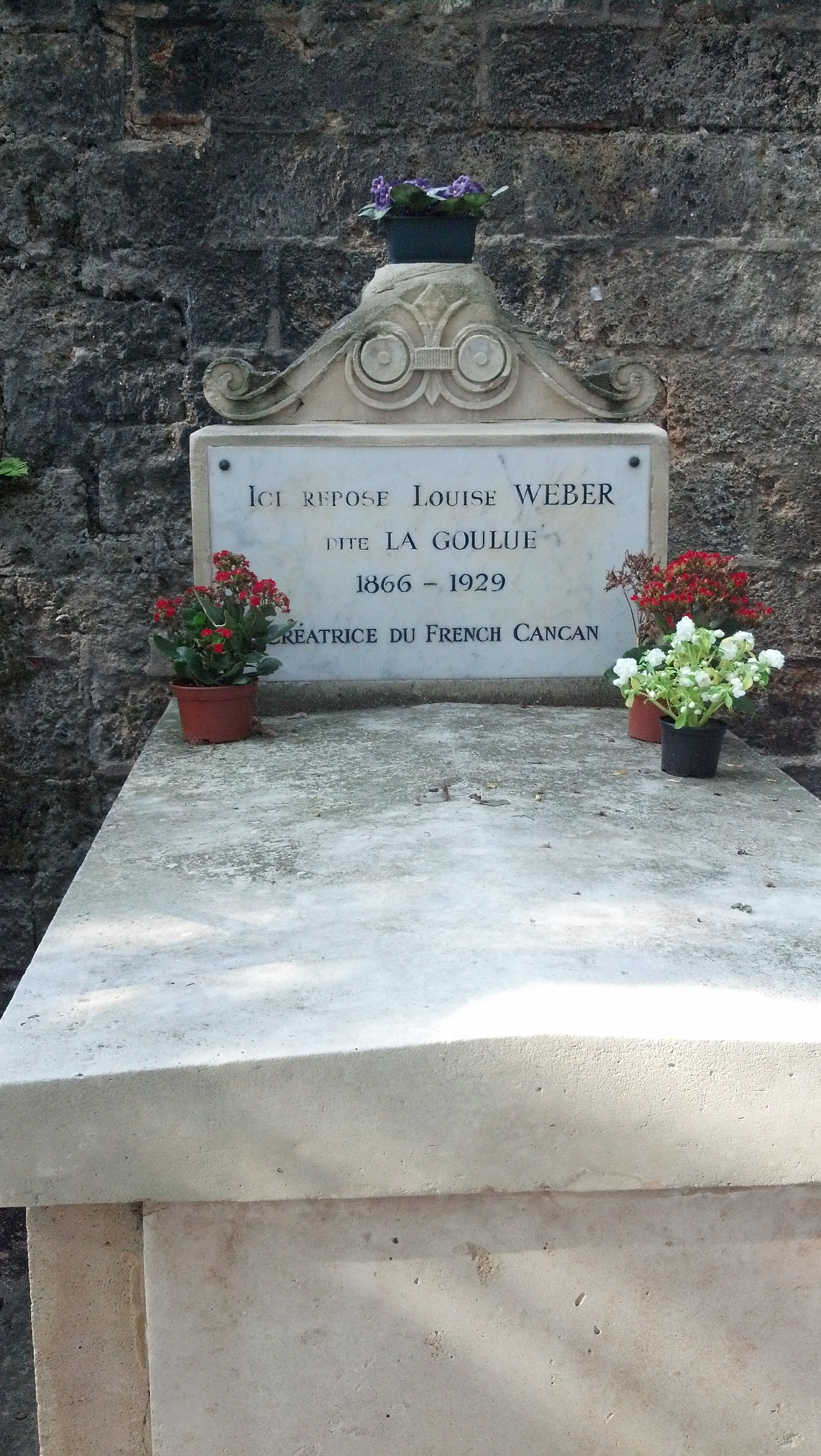
The Montmartre Cemetery grave of Louise Weber, known as La Goulue, creator of the French Can-can

== Cultural references ==
- 1889/90. Painting. Georges Seurat. Le Chahut. Oil on canvas. Kröller-Müller Museum, Otterlo, Netherlands.
- 1891. Poster. Henri de Toulouse-Lautrec. Moulin Rouge: La Goulue. Color lithograph. Approximate print run: 3,000 copies.
- 1934. Ballet. Bar aux Folies-Bergère. Choreography by Ninette de Valois. Music by Emmanuel Chabrier. Created for Ballet Rambert, London, with Alicia Markova as La Goulue and Frederick Ashton as Valentin le Désossé.
- 1950. Novel. Pierre La Mure. Moulin Rouge. Based on the life of Henri de Toulouse-Lautrec. New York Random House.
- 1952. Film. Moulin Rouge. Directed by John Huston. Romulus Films. A biography of Henri de Toulouse-Lautrec, with Katherine Kath as La Goulue and Walter Crisham as Valentin le Désossé.
- 1955. Film. French Cancan. A fictionalized history of the Moulin Rouge, written and directed by Jean Renoir and starring Jean Gabin. Franco London Films. With Françoise Arnoul as La Goulue and Philippe Clay as Valentin le Désossé, called Nini and Casimir le Serpentin in the film.

== See also ==
- Women in dance
