= Joseph Oller =

Founder of the Moulin Rouge cabaret (1839–1922)

Josep Oller
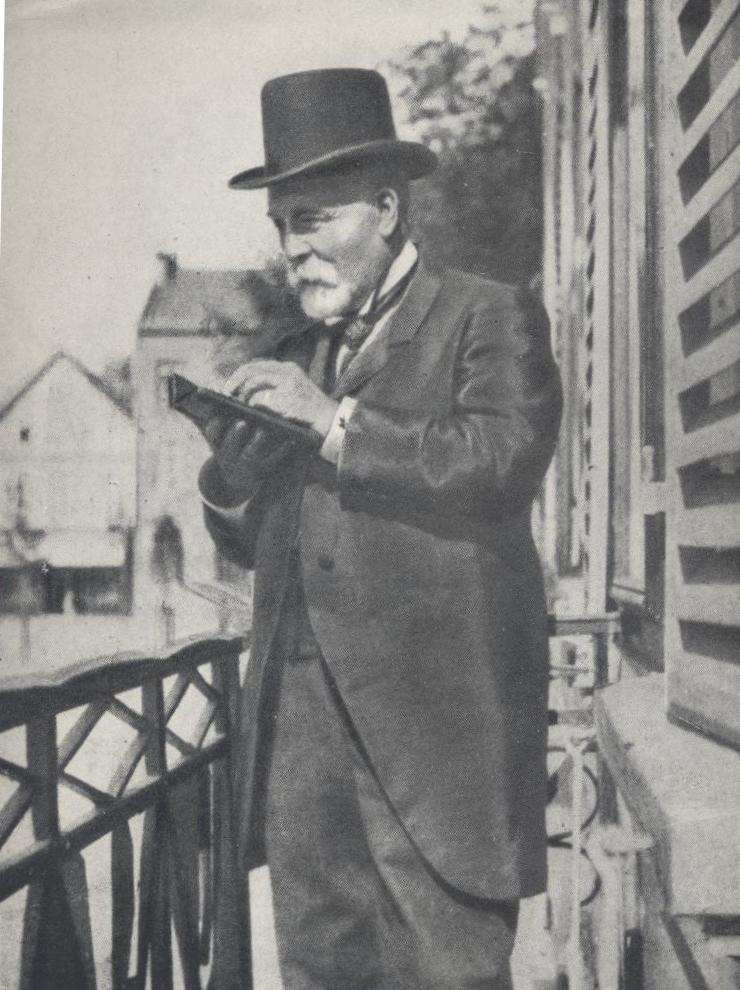
- Born: Josep Oller; 10 February 1839; Terrassa, Catalonia, Spain
- Died: 19 April 1922 (aged 83); Paris, France

Signature
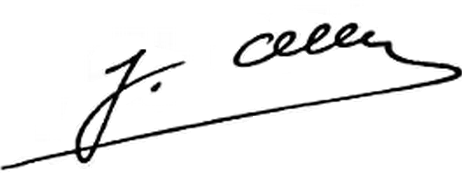

Josep Oller i Roca (1839–1922) was a Catalan entrepreneur who lived in Paris for most of his life. He co-founded the famous cabaret Moulin Rouge with Charles Zidler and was the inventor of parimutuel betting.

== Biography ==
Born in Catalonia in the city of Terrassa, Josep Oller emigrated to France with his family as a child. Later, he relocated back to Spain to study at the university in Bilbao. There, he became fond of cockfighting and started his career as a bookmaker.

Once in Paris, in 1867, Josep Oller invented a new method of wagering, which he named Pari Mutuel (French for Parimutuel betting). He successfully introduced his pool method system at French race tracks. Nonetheless, in 1874, Josep Oller was sentenced to fifteen days in prison and fined for operating illegal gambling. Later, in 1891, the French authorities legalised his system and banned fixed-odds betting. Quickly, Oller's Pari Mutuel spread across most race tracks around the world, but the method was operationalised in engineered systems like that of the automatic totalisator, invented by George Alfred Julius.

In 1870, he relocated to London for a while to avoid the Franco-Prussian War. There he became acquainted with the business of drama.

From 1876, Joseph Oller involved himself with the entertainment industry. First he opened various auditoriums and venues: Fantaisies Oller, La Bombonnière, Théâtre des Nouveautés, Nouveau Cirque and the Montagnes Russes. During 1889 he co-inaugurated the famous Moulin Rouge, together with Charles Zidler. In 1892, he opened the first Parisian music-hall: Paris Olympia, offering new forms of entertainment.

He was buried in Paris in the Cemetery of Père Lachaise.
