= Valentin le Désossé =

French can-can dancer

- Born: Jacques Renaudin; 26 February 1843; Paris
- Died: 4 March 1907 (aged 64); Sceaux, France
- Occupation: Dancer

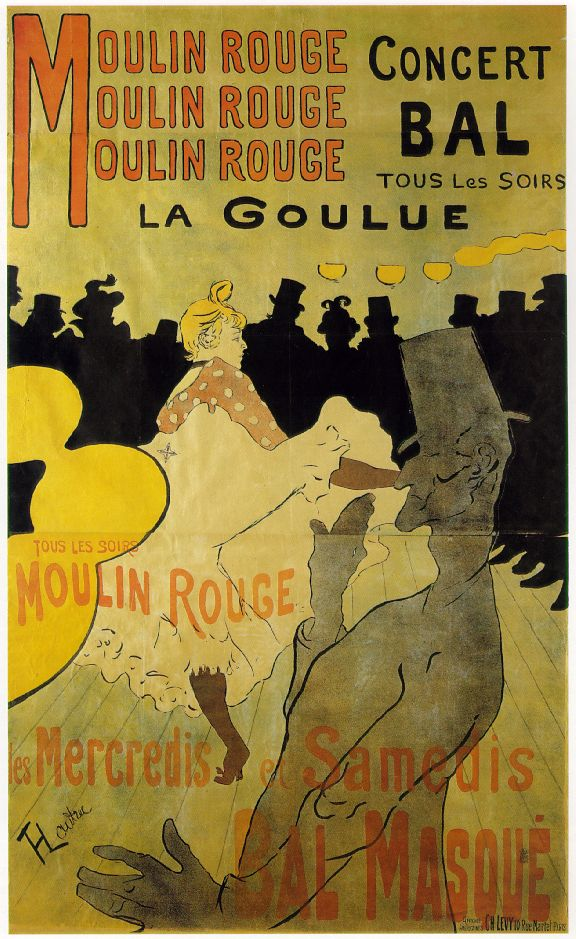
In Henri de Toulouse-Lautrec's 1891 poster, Moulin Rouge: La Goulue, Valentin le Désossé is portrayed dancing with his partner, Louise Weber, at the Moulin Rouge

Valentin le Désossé ("Valentin the Boneless"; 26 February 1843 – 4 March 1907) was the stage name of Jacques Renaudin, a French can-can dancer who was a star of the Moulin Rouge in the 1890s as the partner of Louise Weber, known as La Goulue (The Glutton).

== Star of the Moulin Rouge ==
Not much is known about the life of Jacques Renaudin. He may have been the son of a notary from Sceaux, a commune in the southern suburbs of Paris, and it is thought that, as an adult, he worked as a wine merchant by day. It is certain, however, that at night he danced at the Moulin Rouge, the famed cabaret in the Pigalle district of Paris, near Montmartre. There he formed a partnership with La Goulue, dancing the chahut, a form of the can-can. As a team, they were the toast of tout le monde in fin de siècle Paris.

Renaudin was tall and slender, with an aquiline nose and a prominent chin, giving him a notably distinctive profile. His long arms and legs resulted in an elongated silhouette, aiding in his performance. He acquired his stage name because of the elasticity of his articulations. With lengthy limbs, he could perform difficult contortions with unusual grace, almost as if he were boneless. Moving from position to position with astonishing fluidity and beauty, usually wearing a black suit and a top hat, he was much admired.

According to legend, he danced 39,962 waltzes, 27,220 quadrilles, 14,966 polkas and mazurkas, and 1,000 lancers for a total of 83,112 performances on the stage of the Moulin Rouge. He never accepted pay for his extraordinary performances, as he danced merely for the love of it. He retired from the stage in 1895 and faded into obscurity.

Valentin le Désossé was one of the few men to dance the can-can professionally. He was a popular attraction at the Moulin Rouge in the early 1890s.

== Cultural references ==
- 1889/90. Painting. Georges Seurat. Le Chahut. Oil on canvas. Kröller-Müller Museum, Otterlo, Netherlands.
- 1891. Poster. Henri de Toulouse-Lautrec. Moulin Rouge: La Goulue. Color lithograph. Approximate print run: 3,000 copies.
- 1934. Ballet. Bar aux Folies-Bergère. Choreography by Ninette de Valois. Music by Emmanuel Chabrier. Created for Ballet Rambert, London, with Alicia Markova as La Goulue and Frederick Ashton as Valentin le Désossé.
- 1950. Novel. Pierre La Mure. Moulin Rouge. Based on the life of Henri de Toulouse-Lautrec. New York: Random House.
- 1952. Film. Moulin Rouge. Directed by John Huston. Romulus Films. A biography of Henri de Toulouse-Lautrec, with Katherine Kath as La Goulue and Walter Crisham as Valentin le Désossé.
- 1954. Film. French Cancan. A fictionalized history of the Moulin Rouge, written and directed by Jean Renoir. Franco-London Films. With Françoise Arnoul as La Goulue and Philippe Clay as Valentin le Désossé, called Nini and Casimir le Serpentin in the film.
