= Féerie (Moulin Rouge) =

Stage show at the Moulin Rouge, Paris, France

- Promotional poster for the show.
- Company: Moulin Rouge
- Genre: Cabaret/Revue
- Date of premiere: 1999
- Location: Paris, France

Creative team
- Producer: Jacki Clerico
- Creators: Doris Haug; Rugerro Angeletti
- Choreographer: Bill Goodson
- Costume Designer: Corrado Colabucci
- Set Designer: Gaetano Castelli
- Lighting Designer: Christian Bréan
- Composer: Pierre Porte
- Lyricist: Charles Level
- Ballet Mistress: Janet Pharaoh
- Asst Choreographer: Erik O. Sorensen
- Asst Ballet Mistress: Amanda Diddle
- Stage Director: Thierry Outrilla
- Stage Manager: Olivier Lepelletier
- Official website

Féerie is the resident stage show at the Moulin Rouge, a famous cabaret venue in Paris, France. The show premiered on 23 December 1999. It replaced the Moulin Rouge's centenary show Formidable, which ran from 20 February 1988, to 14 November 1999. After the success of the revue Frou-Frou (1963–1965), a superstition emerged, and every show at the Moulin Rouge has since been titled with a name beginning with the letter F. Féerie continues this tradition.
