= Can-can =

Music-hall dance

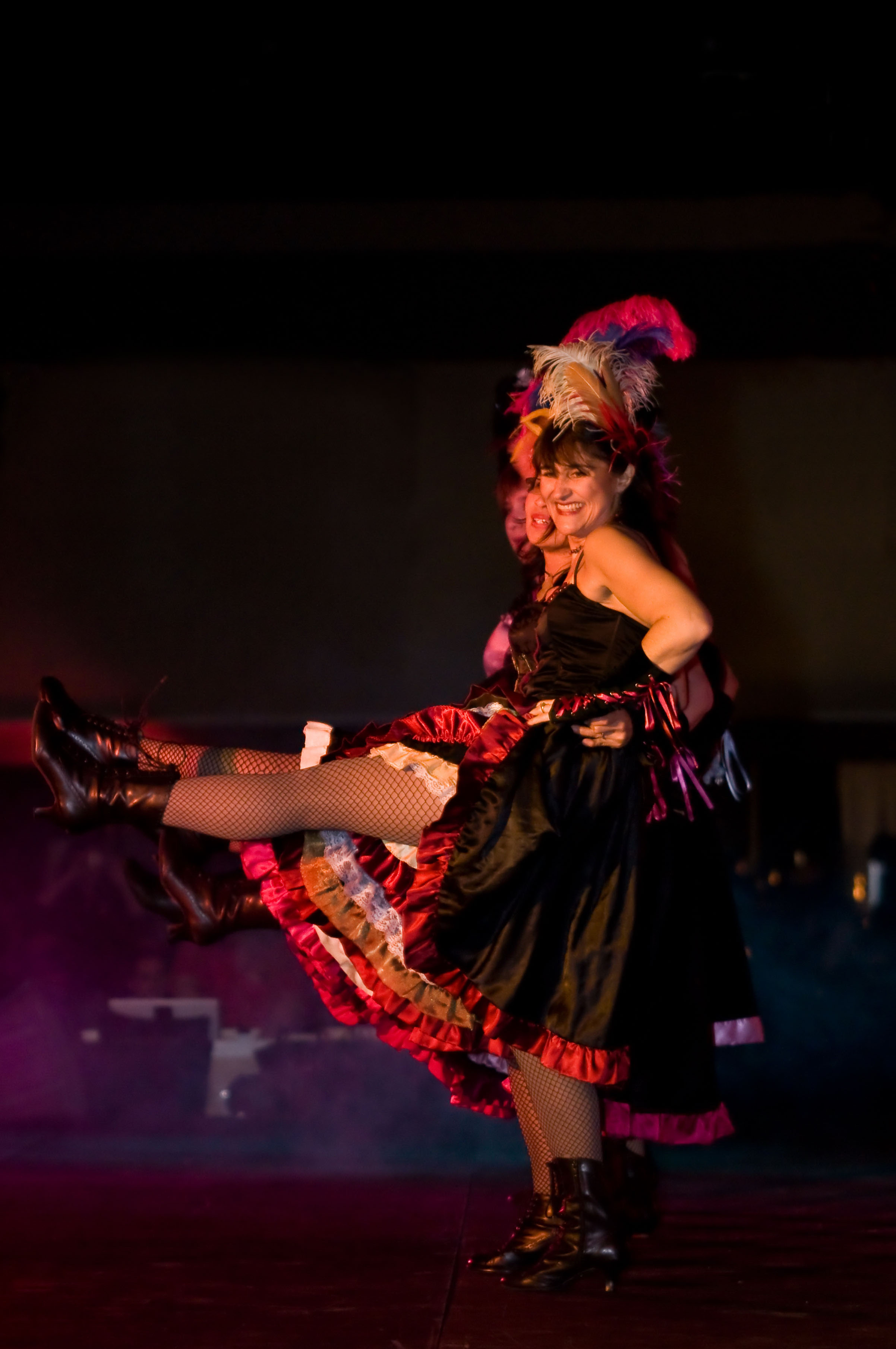
Can-can performers

Cancan section from the overture to Orphée aux enfers (1:46)

The can-can (also spelled cancan as in the original French [kɑ̃kɑ̃]) is a high-energy, physically demanding dance that became a popular music-hall dance in the 1840s, continuing in popularity in French cabaret to modern days. Originally danced by couples, it is traditionally associated with a chorus line of female dancers. The main features of the dance are the vigorous manipulation of skirts and petticoats, along with high kicks, splits, and cartwheels.

== History ==
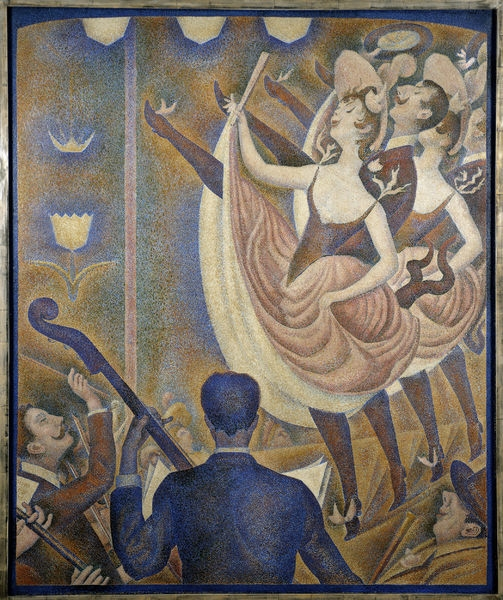
Georges Seurat, 1889–90, Le Chahut, oil on canvas, 170 cm × 141 cm (67 in × 56 in), Kröller-Müller Museum

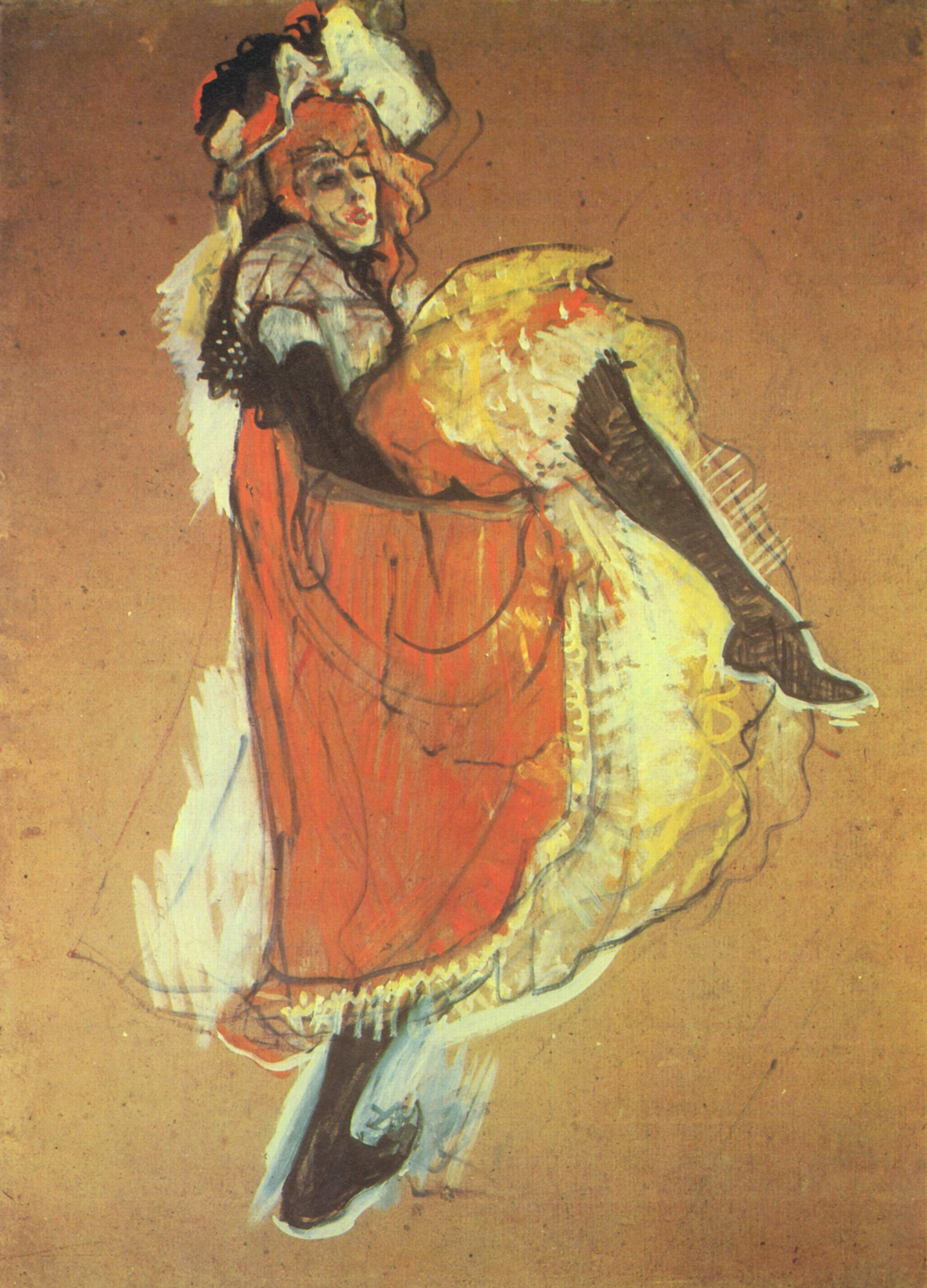
Toulouse-Lautrec, Jane Avril Dancing

The can-can is believed to have evolved from the final figure in the quadrille, a social dance for four or more couples. The exact origin of the dance is obscure, but the steps may have been inspired by a popular entertainer of the 1820s, Charles-François Mazurier (1798–1828), well known for his mime and acrobatic dance, including the grand écart or jump splits—both popular features of the can-can; his greatest success was in Jocko, or The Brazilian Ape (1825).

The dance was considered scandalous, and for a while there were attempts to suppress it. This may have been partly because in the 19th century, women wore pantalettes, which had an open crotch, and the high kicks were intentionally revealing. There is no evidence that can-can dancers wore special closed underwear, although it has been said that the Moulin Rouge management did not permit dancers to perform in "revealing undergarments". Occasionally, people dancing the can-can were arrested, but there is no record of its being banned, as some accounts claim. Throughout the 1830s, it was often groups of men, particularly students, who danced the can-can at public dance-halls.

As the dance became more popular, professional performers emerged, although it was still danced by individuals, not by a chorus line. A few men became can-can stars in the 1840s to 1861 and an all-male group known as the Quadrille des Clodoches performed in London in 1870. However, women performers were much more widely known.

By the 1890s, it was possible to earn a living as a full-time dancer and stars such as La Goulue and Jane Avril emerged, who were highly paid for their appearances at the Moulin Rouge and elsewhere. The most prominent male can-can dancer of the time was Valentin le Désossé (Valentin the Boneless), a frequent partner of La Goulue. The professional dancers of the Second Empire and the fin de siècle developed the can-can moves that were later incorporated by the choreographer Pierre Sandrini in the spectacular "French Cancan", which he devised at the Moulin Rouge in the 1920s and presented at his own Bal Tabarin from 1928. This was a combination of the individual style of the Parisian dance-halls and the chorus-line style of British and American music halls.

== Outside France ==
Outside France, the can-can achieved popularity in music halls, where it was danced by groups of women in choreographed routines. This style was imported back into France in the 1920s for the benefit of tourists, and the "French Cancan" was born—a highly choreographed routine lasting ten minutes or more, with the opportunity for individuals to display their "specialities". The main moves are the high kick or battement, the rond de jambe (quick rotary movement of lower leg with knee raised and skirt held up), the port d'armes (turning on one leg, while grasping the other leg by the ankle and holding it almost vertically), the cartwheel and the grand écart (the flying or jump splits). It has become common practice for dancers to scream and yelp while performing the can-can.

The can-can was introduced in America on 23 December 1867 by Giuseppina Morlacchi, dancing as a part of The Devil's Auction at the Theatre Comique in Boston. It was billed as "Grand Gallop Can-Can, composed and danced by Mlles. Morlacchi, Blasina, Diani, Ricci, Baretta... accompanied with cymbals and triangles by the coryphees and corps de ballet." The new dance received an enthusiastic reception. By the 1890s the can-can was out of style in New York dance halls, having been replaced by the hoochie coochie.

The can-can became popular in Alaska and Yukon, Canada, where theatrical performances feature can-can dancers to the present day.

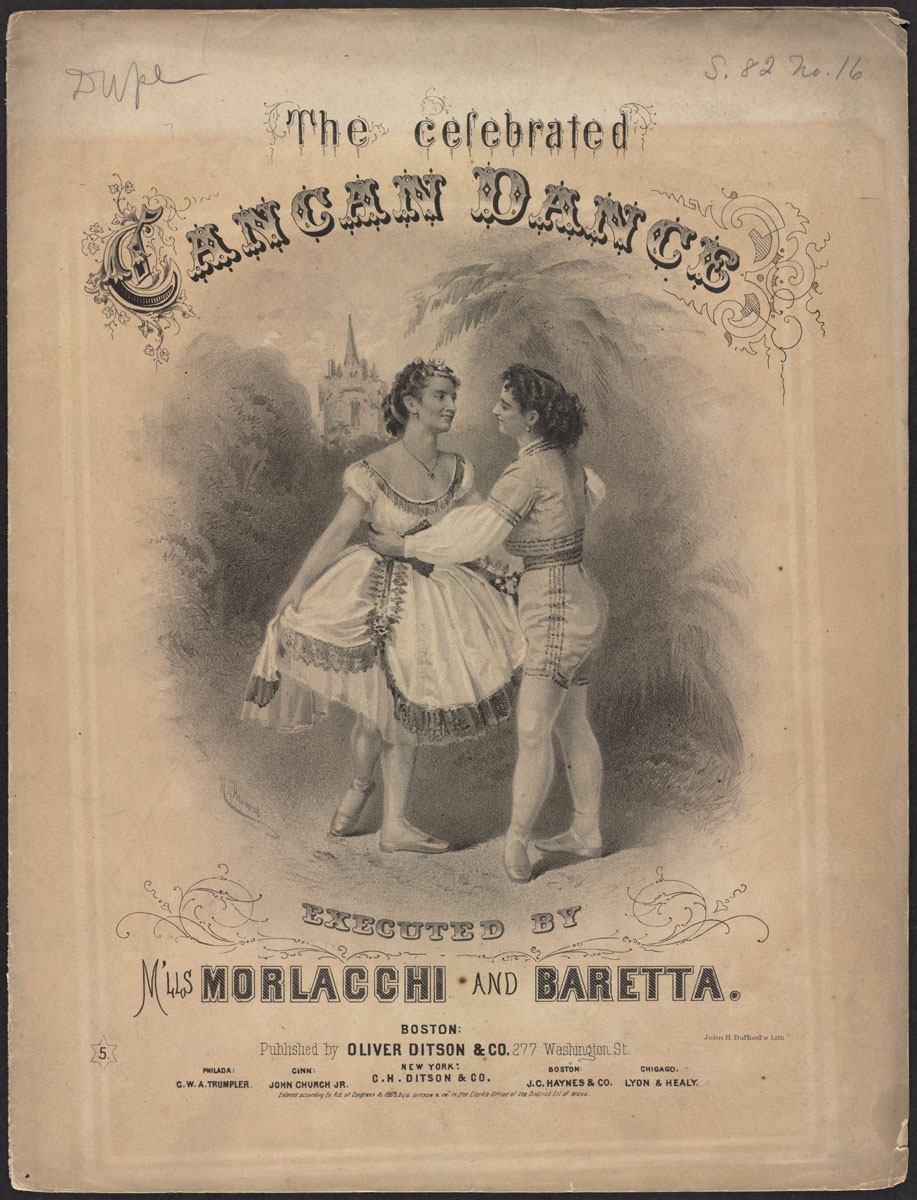
Giuseppina Morlacchi introduced the can-can to American audiences in 1867.

Can-can girls participate in Golden Days Parade, Fairbanks, Alaska, 1986

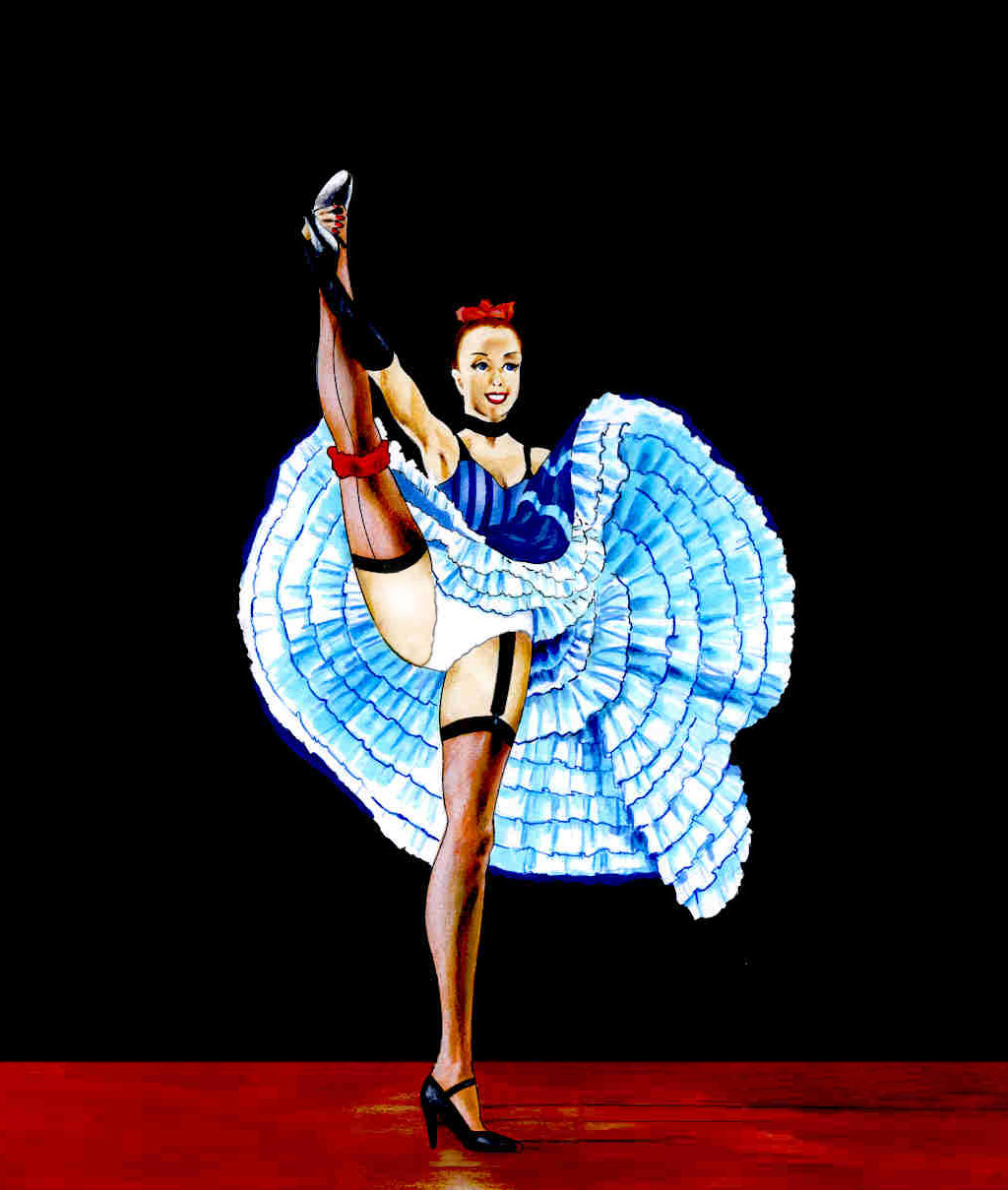
Dancer performing a pied en l'air

== In other arts ==
Many composers have written music for the can-can. The most famous is French composer Jacques Offenbach's Galop Infernal in his operetta Orphée aux Enfers (Orpheus in the Underworld) (1858). However, the galop is actually another sort of dance. Other examples occur in Franz Lehár's operetta The Merry Widow (1905) and Cole Porter's musical play Can-Can (1954), which formed the basis for the 1960 musical film Can-Can starring Frank Sinatra and Shirley MacLaine. Some other songs that have become associated with the can-can include Aram Khachaturian's "Sabre Dance" from his ballet Gayane (1938) and the music hall standard "Ta-ra-ra Boom-de-ay". In 1955 Jean Renoir's film French Cancan, starring Jean Gabin as the director of a music hall which features the can-can, was released.

The can-can has often appeared in ballet, such as Léonide Massine's La Boutique fantasque (1919) and Gaîté Parisienne (1938), as well as The Merry Widow. Another example is the climax of Jean Renoir's film French Cancan. A well-known can-can occurs at the finale of the "Dance of the Hours" from the opera La Gioconda by Amilcare Ponchielli.

French painter Henri de Toulouse-Lautrec produced several paintings and a large number of posters of can-can dancers. Other painters of the can-can included Georges Seurat, Georges Rouault, and Pablo Picasso.

The can-can has appeared in numerous film and TV productions, such as the dance being featured prominently in Baz Luhrmann's Moulin Rouge!. The 2009 anime series Fairy Tail featured the music as one of its themes, while a promotional advertisement for Foster's Home for Imaginary Friends featured one of its lead characters, Coco, performing the dance before destroying the set around her. A remixed version, titled "William Tell Overture", by Kensuke Ushio also features in the anime series Dandadan.

In all versions of the Disney Parks's boat ride It's a Small World, there are some can-can dolls that dancing near the Eiffel Tower to represent the origin country of can-can, France.

The can can was covered by the British Two-tone Ska Band Bad Manners who peaked at Number 3 in the charts with the cover

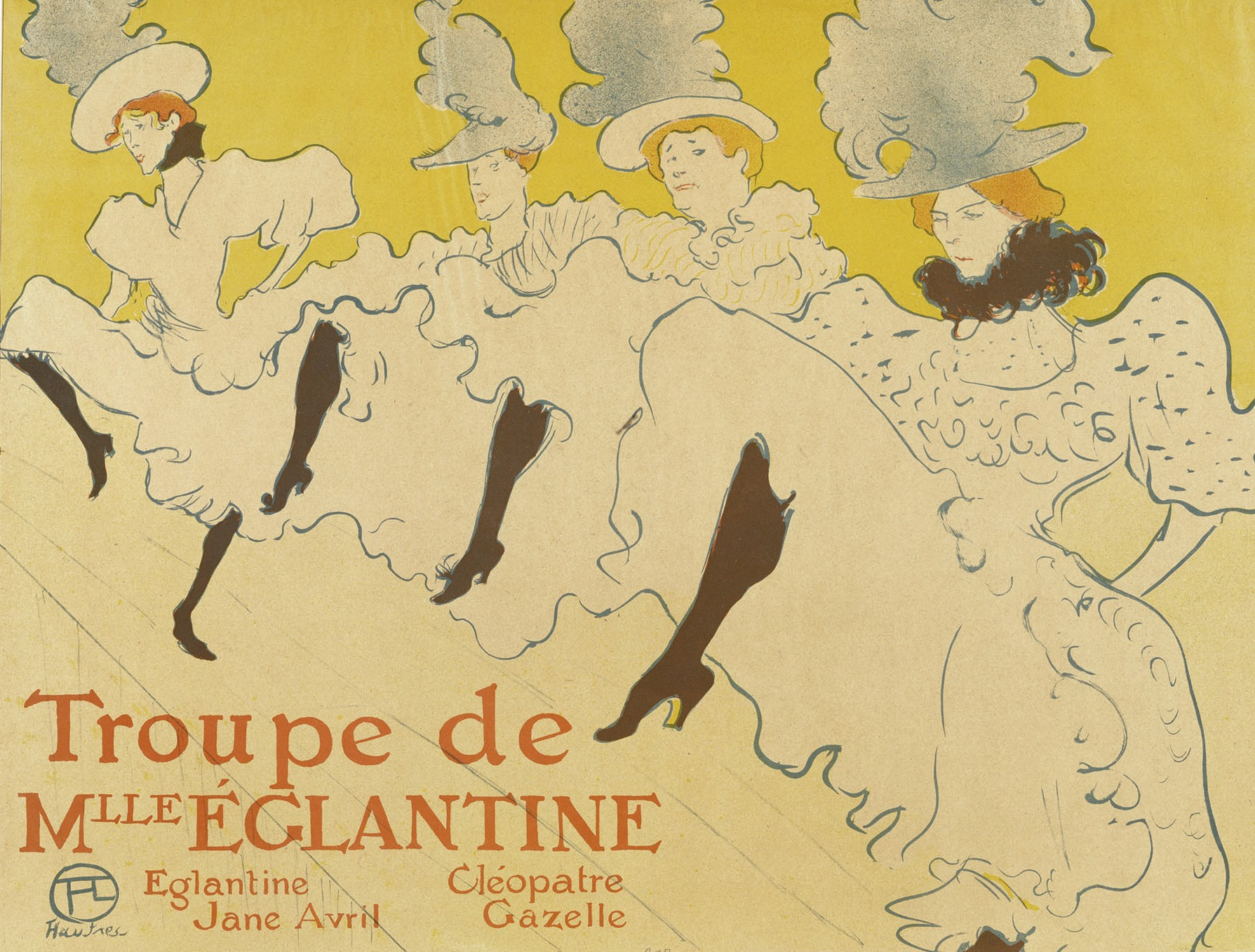
Depiction of the can-can by Henri de Toulouse-Lautrec, 1895

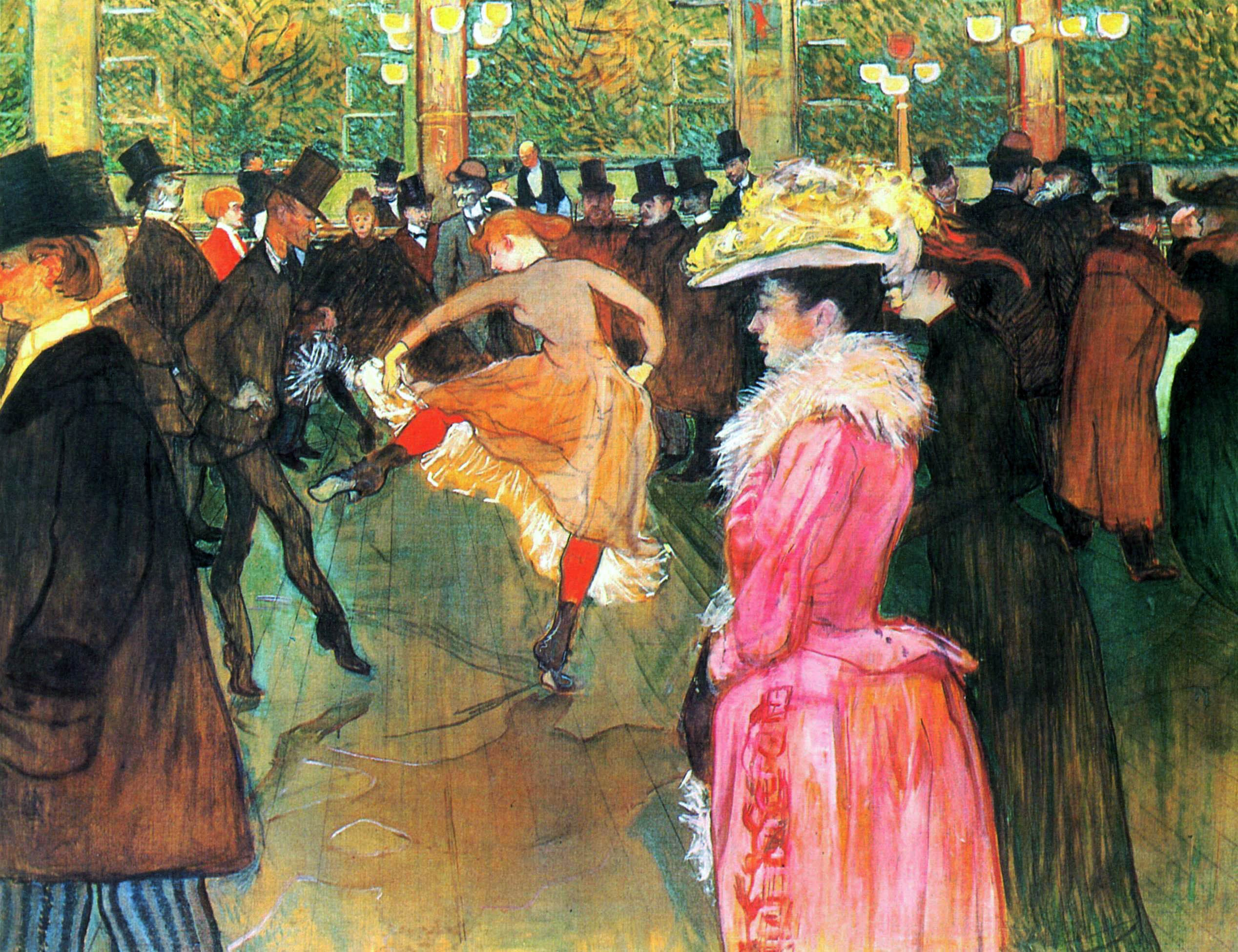
The Moulin Rouge featured in a Toulouse-Lautrec painting

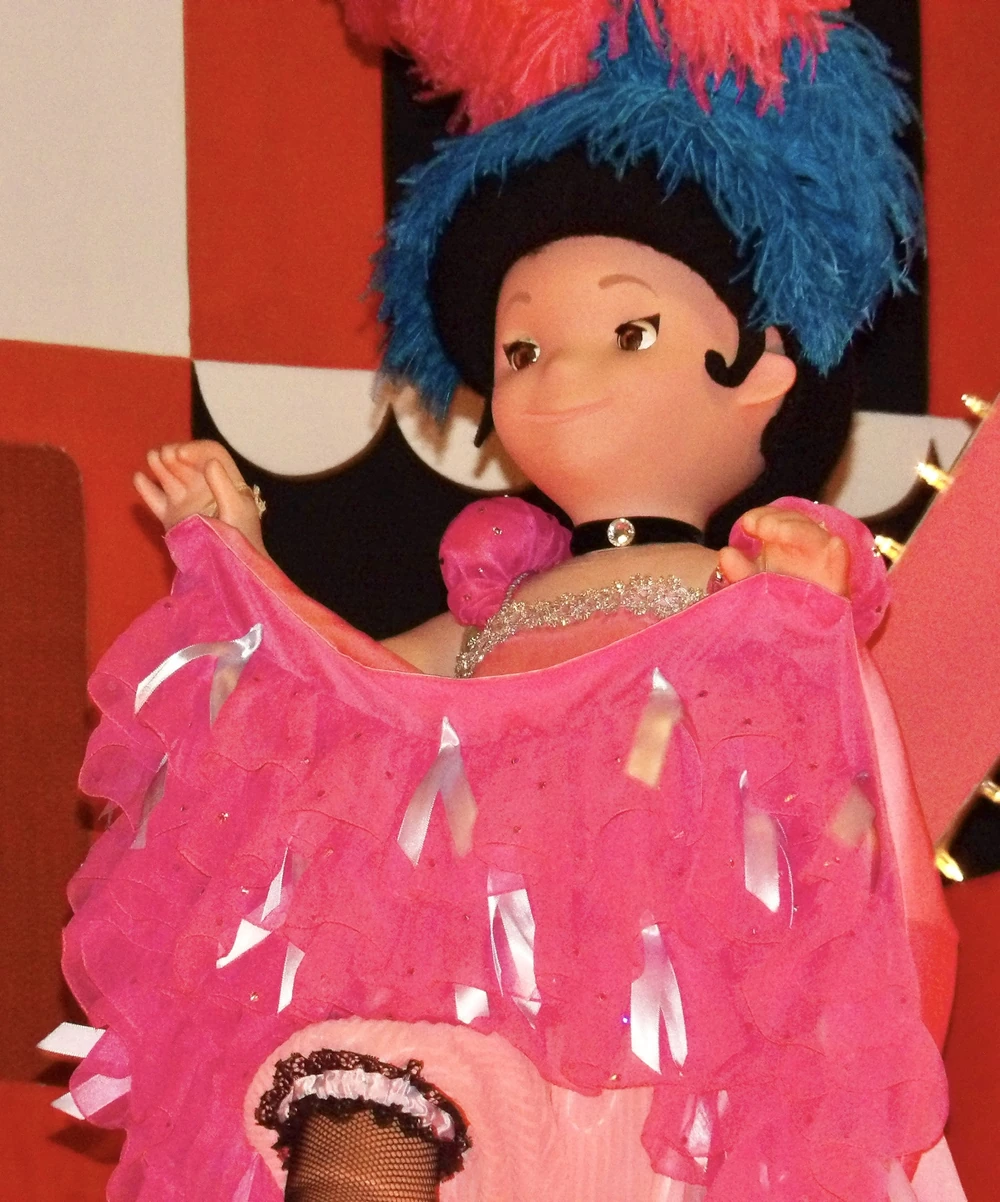
Can-can doll in the Disneyland version of It's a Small World
