= Charles Zidler =

French impresario

Charles-Joseph Zidler
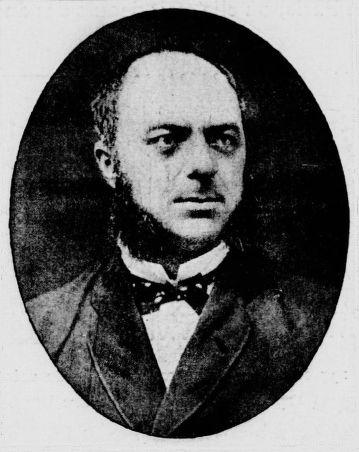
- Born: 29 December 1831; Saint-Cloud
- Died: 10 November 1897 (aged 65); Paris

Charles-Joseph Zidler (1831–1897) was a French impresario. He co-founded the Paris cabaret Moulin Rouge with Joseph Oller.

== Portrayals in movies ==
- Harold Kasket in Moulin Rouge, 1952 movie directed by John Huston.
- Jean Gabin in French Cancan, 1955 movie directed by Jean Renoir.
- The character Harold Zidler, played by Jim Broadbent in Baz Luhrmann's 2001 movie Moulin Rouge!.
- Dominique Besnehard in the television movie Mystère au Moulin-Rouge.
