= Eugénie Buffet =

French singer

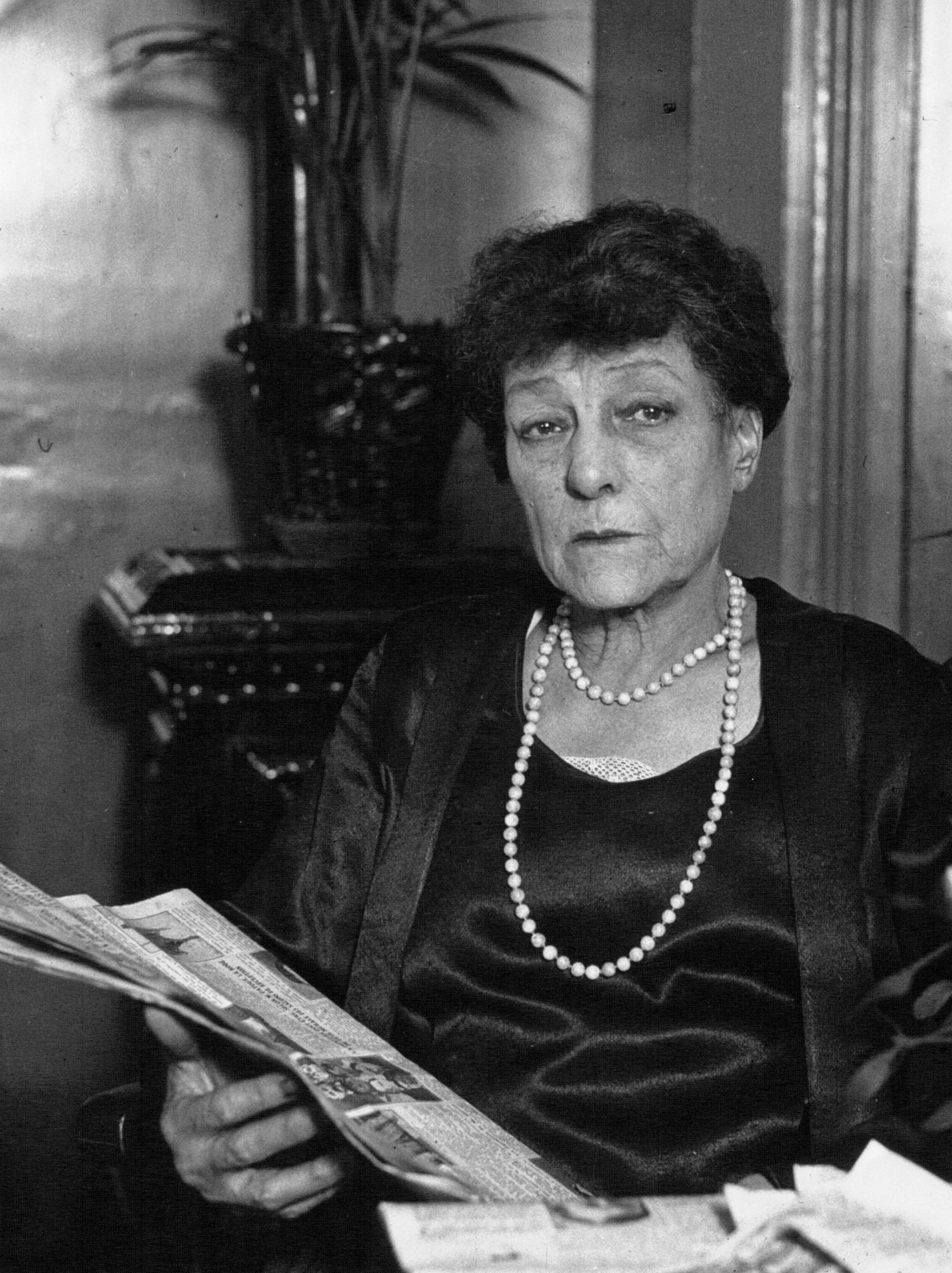
- Eugénie Buffet in 1933

Background information
- Born: 1866; Tlemcen, French Algeria
- Origin: Paris, France
- Died: 1934 (aged 67–68)
- Genres: chanson réaliste torch songs
- Occupation(s): singer, actress

Eugénie Buffet (French pronunciation: [øʒeni byfɛ]; 1866–1934) was a French singer who rose to fame in France just prior to World War I. She has been called one of the first, if not the first, performer of the chanson réaliste (realist song) genre. She became a national sensation in France, performing in the fashionable cafés-concerts of Paris as well as embarking on both national and international tours. Her biggest success is said to be her performance of the song "La Sérénade du Pavé" (Sidewalk Serenade), written by Jean Varney in 1895. She was also known to perform in the street for charity in the poorer areas of Paris – work for which she was awarded the Légion d'honneur.

== Early life ==
Born as Marie Buffet in Tlemcen, Algeria to a French family in 1866 (in an area that was then known as French Algeria), Eugénie Buffet was the daughter of a seamstress and a soldier. When she was six months old, her father died in a military hospital in Oran; as a result her family was quite poor.

At the age of 17, Buffet started acting. She struggled in her early years and was living in near poverty; she had moved to Marseille in order to perform, but she was not very successful at first and was said to have been "booed and hissed off of the stage". She worked mainly in the cafés-concerts of Marseille, until 1886 when she became the mistress of comte Guillaume d'Oilliamson. The wealthy French count brought Buffet with him to Paris to show off to his friends. Buffet went from "near starvation" to living a fashionable Parisian life.

== Career in music ==
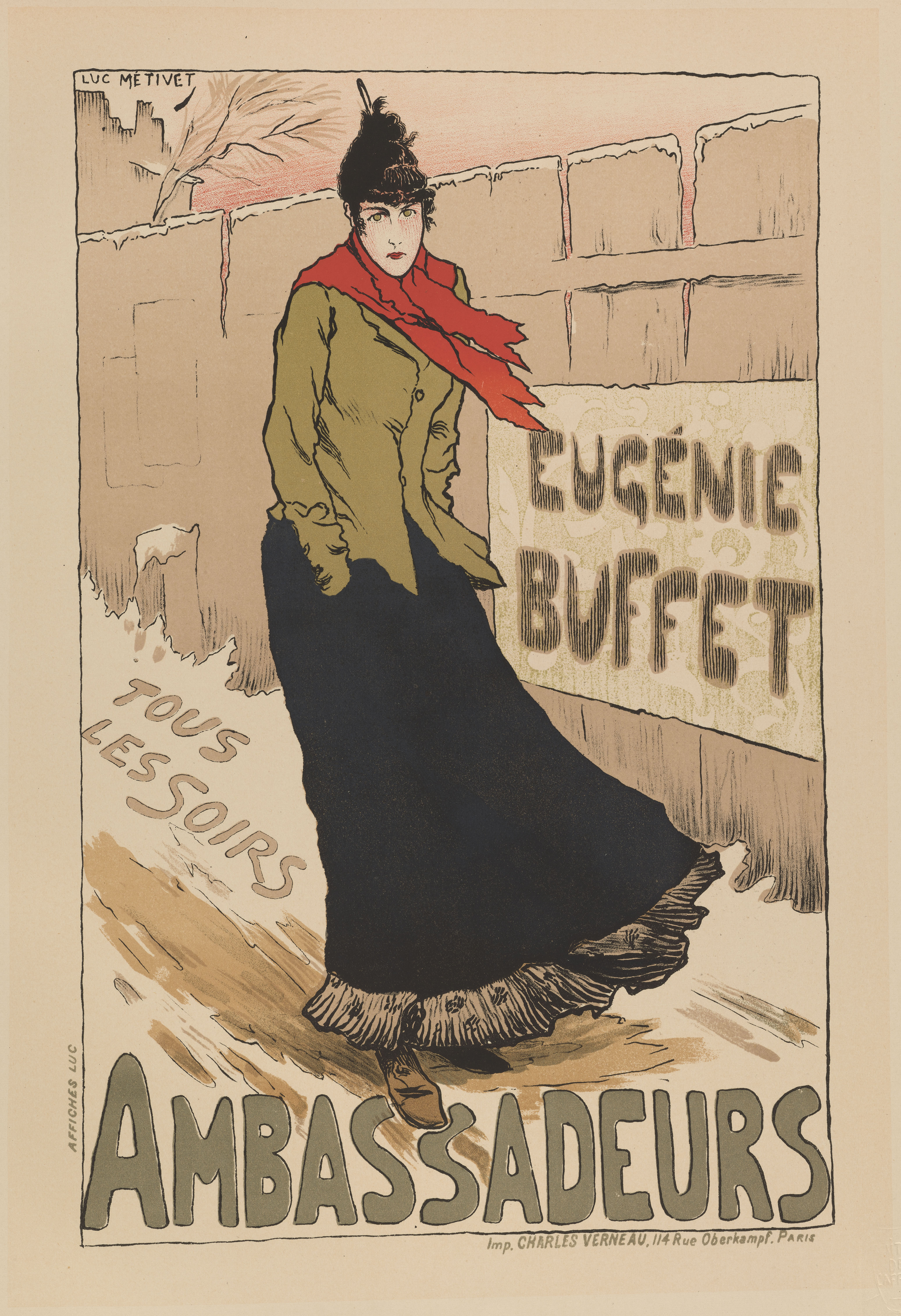
Eugénie Buffet at the Café des Ambassadeurs in 1896, by artist Lucien Métivet

While in Paris, Buffet became involved in right-wing politics; she attended one of the founding rallies of the Ligue des Patriotes and sang "La Marseillaise" for the nationalists. As a result, she became the darling of such anti-Dreyfusards as Paul Déroulède.

In 1892 Buffet attended a performance at Le Chat Noir (the Black Cat) by the cabaret singer Aristide Bruant; Buffet found herself moved by his performance and approached him with the idea of her portraying one of the poor and unfortunate girls of whom Bruant would often sing. Buffet had spent a short time in the Prison Saint-Lazare which had put her into direct contact with women of such description, and she was also said to have followed prostitutes on their rounds at night in order to better emulate their dress and demeanor in her own performances.

Buffet would combine these experiences to create her famous performances as la pierreuse (the streetwalker) and she debuted her character in an 1882 performance at La Cigale, a famous nightclub in the Quartier Pigalle of Paris. During performances Buffet wore a tattered apron and red scarf, a common costume of prostitutes at the time.

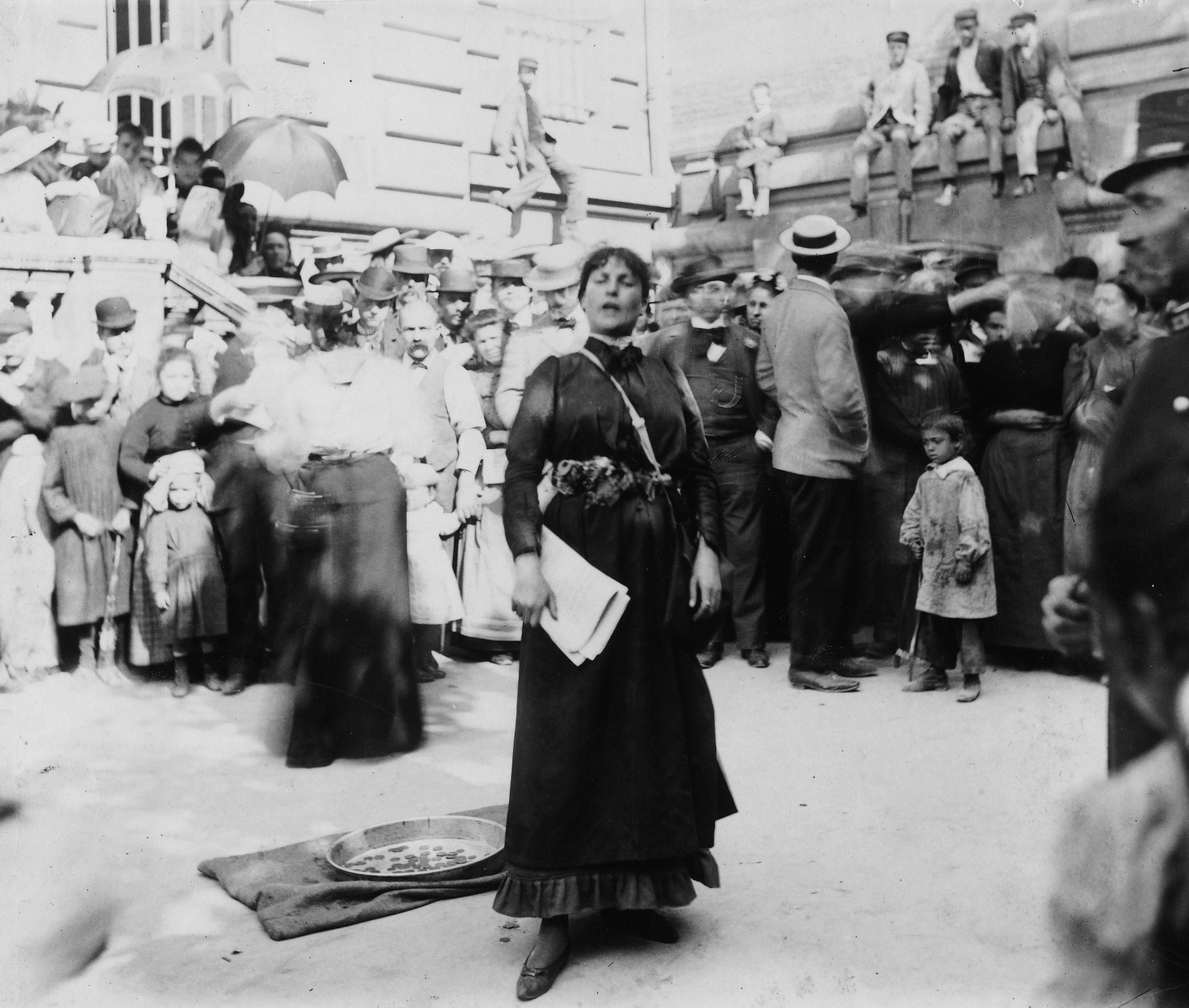
Eugénie Buffet, ca. 1920, photographed by Eugène Atget

Soon Buffet became a national celebrity – she performed at such famous cafés-concerts as the Théâtre de la Gaîté-Montparnasse, the Théâtre de la Gaîté-Rochechouart, and the Café des Ambassadeurs. She also sang in less conventional locations such as the streets of the poorer neighbourhoods of Paris, and even at coal mines, in order to raise money for the poor and homeless. Buffet also performed daily at the Exposition Universelle of 1900, a world's fair held in Paris.

In the early 1900s Buffet tried her hand at managing her own cafés-concerts: From 1902–1903 Buffet ran a cabaret in Montmartre called the Cabaret de la Purée (Down-on-Your-Luck Cabaret) and later in 1903 she ran an establishment called Folies-Pigalle (Pigalle Follies) which was closed down that same year by the police because it was "a meeting-place for right-wing enemies of the regime."

In addition to performing in Paris, Buffet toured and performed for soldiers during World War I, she performed at the Royal Palace of Brussels and in the early 1920s she toured the United States, Morocco and the Antilles.

The film score of the 1931 Jean Renoir film La Chienne included a turn-of-the-century recording of Buffet singing "Sois bonne ô ma belle inconnue" (Be good oh my beautiful unknown).

== Other works ==
In 1927 Buffet appeared in the silent film Napoléon directed by French filmmaker Abel Gance; she played the role of Laetizia Bonaparte, Napoleon's mother.

In 1930 Buffet published her ghostwritten memoir titled: Ma Vie, Mes Amours, Mes Aventures: Confidences recueillies par Maurice Hamel (My Life, My Loves, My Adventures: Confessions obtained by Maurice Hamel), published by writer, poet, journalist and editor Eugène Figuière.

== Death ==
Suffering from illness as early as the late 1920s, Eugénie Buffet fell into poverty by the end of her life. She died in Paris in 1934.

== Portrayal in film ==
Eugénie Buffet was said to have inspired the character of Mademoiselle Amy Jolly, Marlene Dietrich's role in the 1930 film Morocco. French signing icon Édith Piaf also portrayed Eugénie Buffet in the 1954 French musical film French Cancan.
