= Ambassadeurs =

1892 painting by Henri de Toulouse-Lautrec

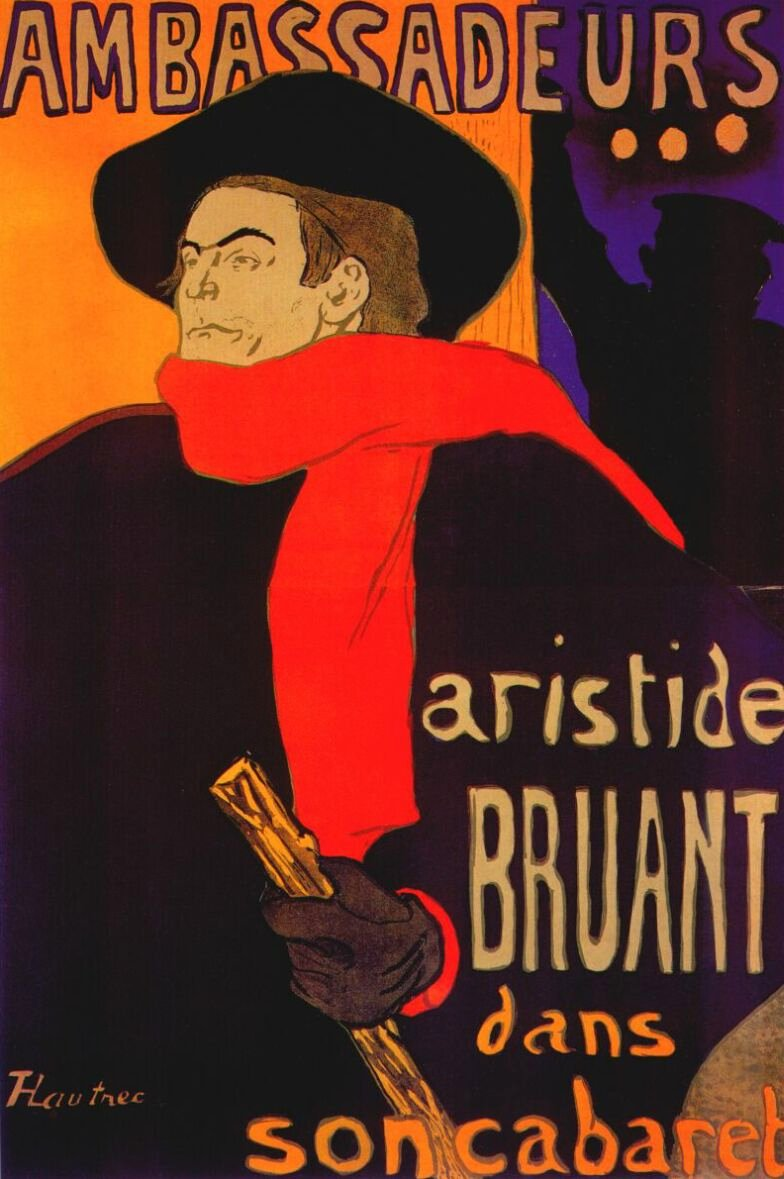
- Artist: Henri de Toulouse-Lautrec
- Year: 1892
- Medium: lithograph
- Dimensions: 150 cm × 100 cm (59 in × 39 in)

Ambassadeurs (also known as Aristide Bruant and Aristide Bruant aux Ambassadeurs) (Note: The title is taken from "the lettering (entire or in part) of the poster itself".) is an 1892 lithograph poster by French post-impressionist Henri de Toulouse-Lautrec. The subject of the poster is Toulouse-Lautrec's friend, cabaret singer Aristide Bruant, performing at the Café des Ambassadeurs.

== Historical background ==
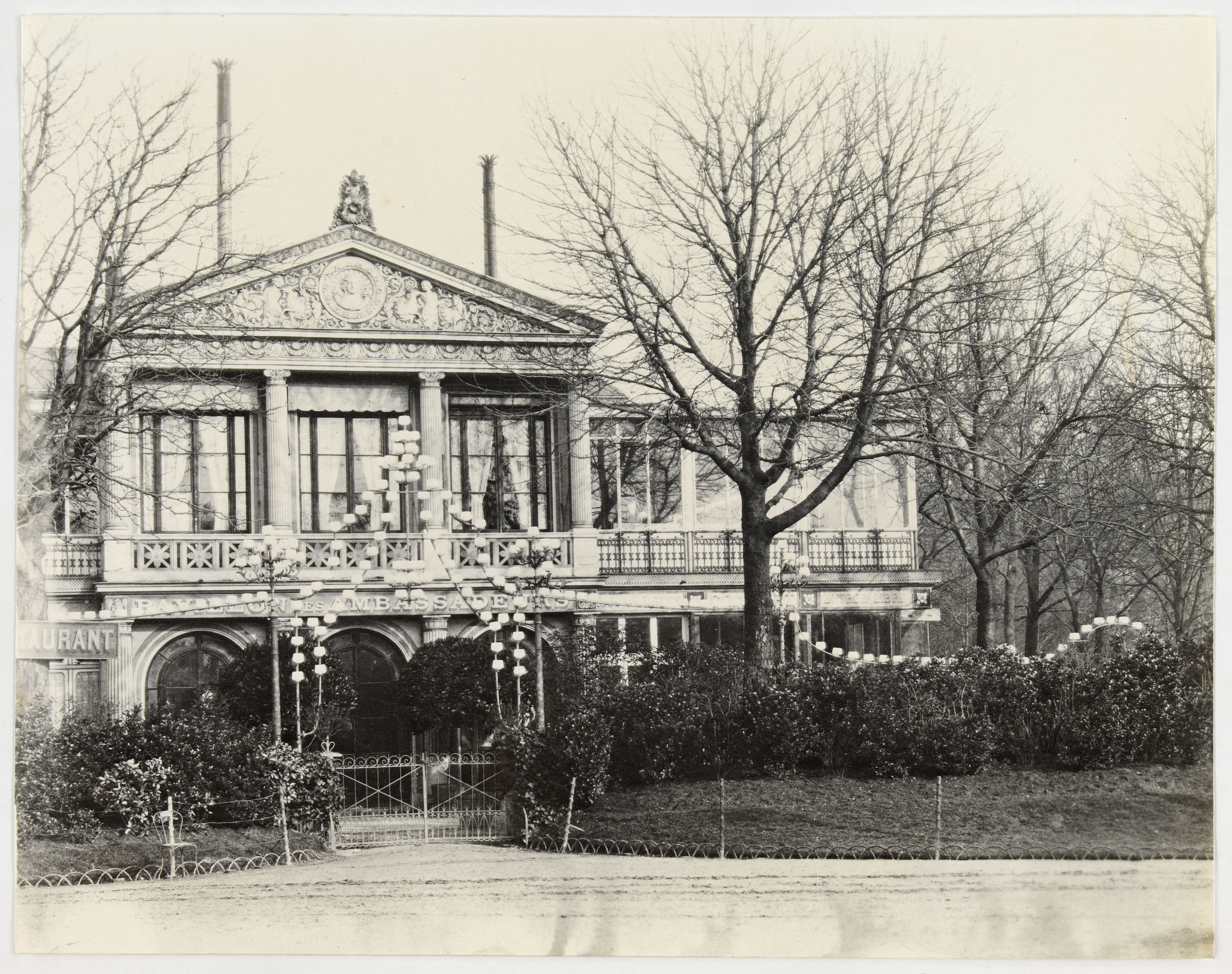
Exterior of Les Ambassadeurs on the Champs-Élysées in 1890

Montmartre's milieu was rough and ready, and its café concerts had long attracted visitors from around the globe. The acts were often coarse, even obscene; Denvir calls them social "escape valves" for both the working and middle classes. Often anti-establishment, they regularly attracted the attention of the police, and—"haunted by police spies"—occasionally closed during periods of political crisis. (Note: In 1873, for example, the Minister of Education, Jules Simon, had condemned the café concerts as "distributing and selling poison amongst us".) By the last decade of the century, the artistes of Montmartre had broadened their appeal; in the words of the art historian Reinhold Heller, "much as the Moulin Rouge brought fashionable Paris to Montmartre, by 1892 fashionable Paris was bringing Montmartre to itself". At the same time, however, Montmartre had reached the pinnacle of its popularity, and as a result, the stars such as Jane Avril and Bruant were receiving more profitable offers elsewhere where they would reach a wider audience. As such, many of the bars and clubs which had made the area famous were moving with them.

While others were opening. One of these, the elegant Ambassadeurs club—known as L'Ambass to its regulars—was situated on the north side of the Champs-Élysées, next to the Hôtel Crillon, and was popular among Lautrec's artist colleagues such as Degas. It was the kind of place, note Bret Waller and Grace Seibeling, whose clientele "came more to see and be seen than to hear the performers". Directed by Pierre Ducarre in the 1890s, it was one of over 20 such café/concert establishments in Paris. (Note: Others included the Eldorado, Ba-ta-clan and the Divan Japonais and the Moulin Rouge.) Lautrec regularly drank there, where he would sketch both performers and customers. (Note: These pieces included Ducarre at the Ambassadeurs (1893), Caudieux (1893), Aux Ambassadeurs: Gens Chic (1893) and At the Ambassadeurs—Cafe-Concert Singer (1894)) Lautrec preferred the déclassé demimonde to his own social class, and was a frequent visitor and customer to its bars and brothels. He enjoyed the café-concert environment for its lights, exuberance, singing and the dance, as well as drinking with likeminded people, although Lautrec was more interested in the artists themselves than their songs. These establishments suited Lautrec for pub crawling in his role as a paparazzo, providing him motifs for his subjects. Such establishments were described by the contemporary journalist Gustave Geffroy as

At once a meeting-place, a salon de conversation, a café, and a smoking-room; in addition one can find there both instrumental and vocal music, droll songs in the choruses of which one may join, comic actors, singers in glittering costumes, sleeveless and décolletes, with flowers in their hair and bouquets in their hands.

The Ambassadeurs was no stranger to artistic portrayal, having already been the subject of several paintings by Degas a few years before Lautrec, who had painted Café-Concert at Les Ambassadeurs (in 1876) and Singer with a Glove (in 1878) amongst others. (Note: Others include, At the Ambassadeurs, Mademoiselle Bécat around 1875.)

== Subject ==
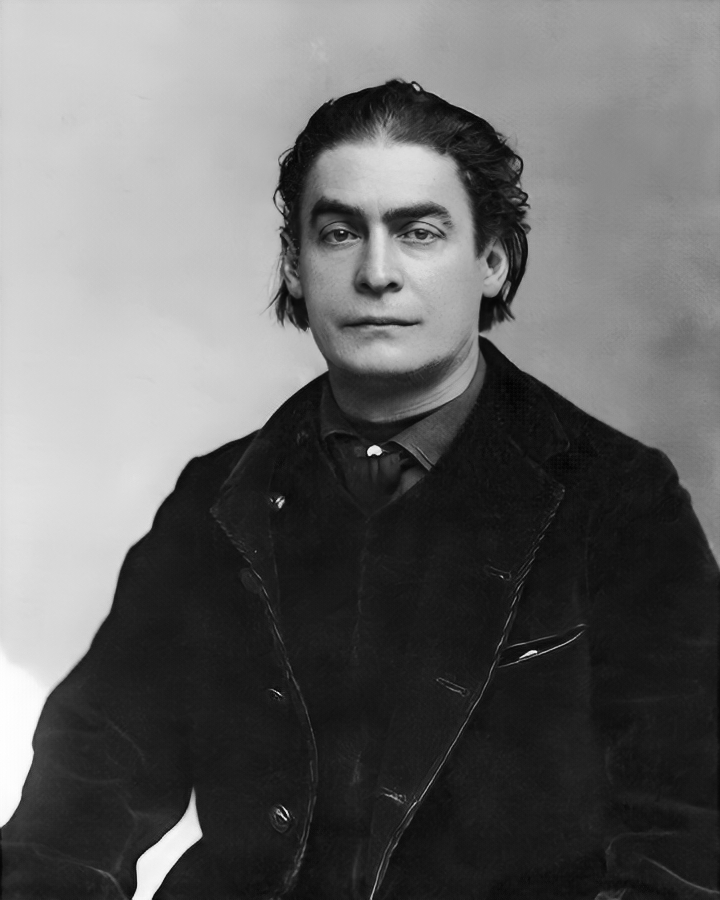
Aristide Bruant by Nadar from around 1898

Aristide Bruant was a singer, composer, impresario, chansonnier and restauranteur had founded La Mirliton (Note: "The Reed Pipe".) cabaret bar in 1885. He performed in a ribbed velvet suit, floppy dark hat, black cape, red scarf and short boots; The critic Parker Tyler calls this "he accepted costume of a bohemian artist", and Jules Lemaitre described how Bruant looked like a "lord among pimps, with a face like a Roman emperor, in his ribbed velvet suit, with his high boots and red scarf and his rough, arrogant voice". In 1889, a Parisian commentator wrote

...everyone knows him. Tall, with a broad barrel chest and Napoleonic profile; but his eyes are crafty and his lips sardonic. He wears sweeping velvet garments, heavy boots and, when he goes out, a long Inverness cape and an immensely wide-brimmed hat.

His music hall style has been described as "rough and rustic"; the novelist Jules Renard diarised that Bruant "shouts his songs with his hands in his pockets" and "insolent slang"—les engueulades—laced with sarcasm, particularly to his bourgeoise audience. (Note: For example, calling them "scoundrel", "prostitute, "cut throat" and "sonofabitch" on their arrival and "pigs" as they left. Patric O'Connor argues that " what Zola did for the novel, Bruant did for la chanson parisienne".) He forced his personality upon his audience "like the great diseuse of his time", Yvette Guilbert. He sang of the highs and lows of proletarian life in Paris. He and Lautrec had first met in 1885, and were both good friends and intellectual equals. The artist stayed at Bruant's house in Saint-Jean-les-Deux-Jumeaux in April 1893; no long letters between them now survive.

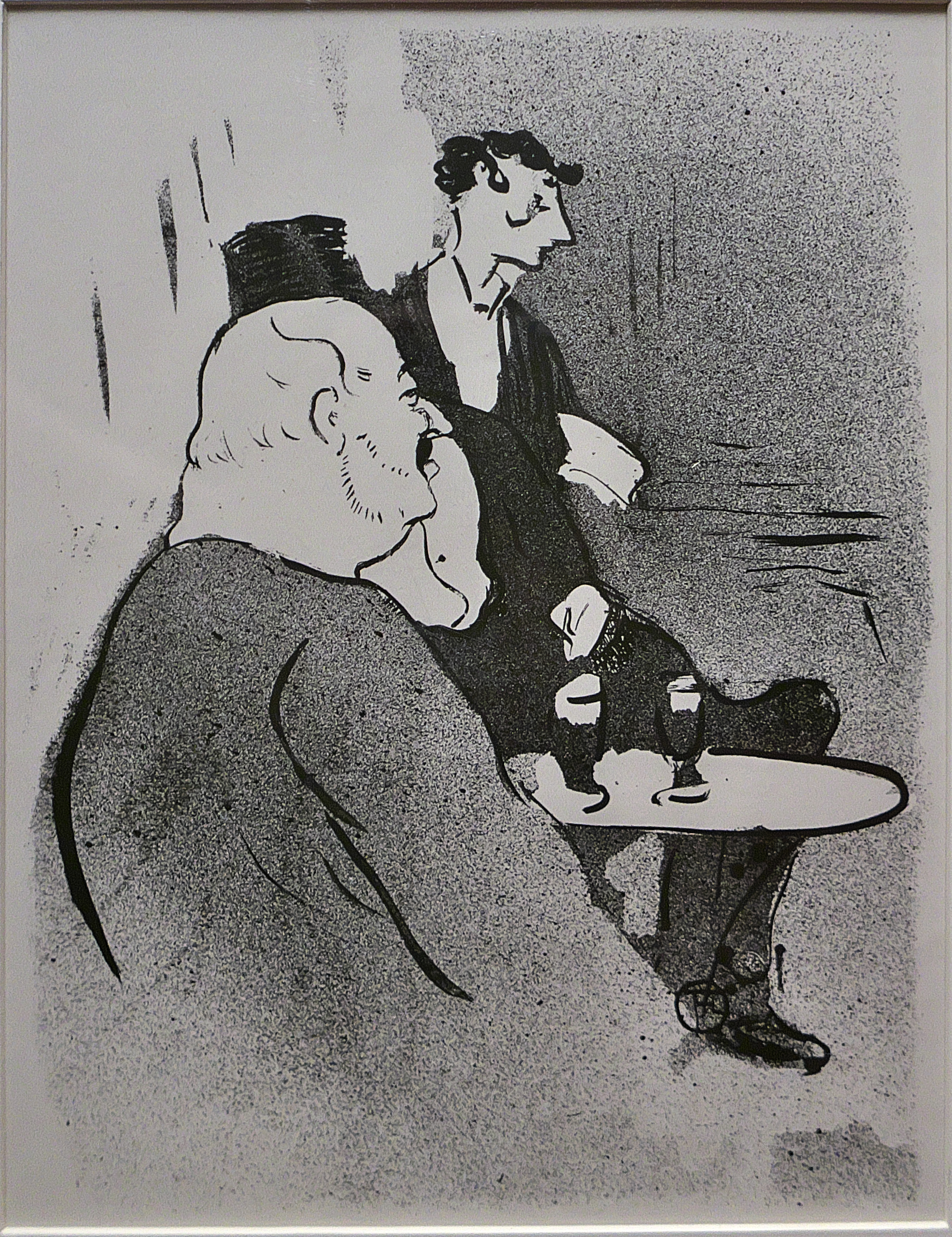
Pierre Ducarre, owner of the Ambasadeurs , in a 1893 lithograph by Lautrec

Lautrec painted Bruant several times over the course of his career, although Lautrec preferred to capture the candid moment and motion, and Bruant, "with his silhouette and statuesque manner, offered little variety to a portraitist" notes Patrick O'Connor. However, the critic David Sweetman has argued that Bruant "inspired the most startling and memorable posters" Lautrec composed, due to the artist's ability to par the figure down into simple and bold shapers and outlines. Bruant's first appearance at Les Ambassadeurs was on 3 June 1892, and—by now an accomplished promotor of his own brand—for this he commissioned Lautrec to design him a poster to show him in the role of impresario. Bruant had recognised the paradigm-shifting impact of La Goulue and instinctively perhaps knew a similar sensation would advance his career. A (probably apocryphal) contemporary anecdote relates that Bruant, when he first saw the poster, was impressed at how imposing Lautrec had made him. He is supposed to have asked Lautrec "am I that grand?", which garnered the reply, "even grander, that's what posterity will say".

== Development ==
He also helped make [his subjects] well-known by depicting them in a gripping, unforgettable way in his posters. Who is not familiar with Lautrec's posters? Or his lithographs? In these two techniques he displayed a mastery equal to that of his paintings. In fact, do not the former often possess more authority than the latter? The shapes are purer since their existence is totally dependent on the suggestive power of the outline. The color, sensitively spread out in large, flat areas, seems to have an almost spiritual power, and the harmonies obtained are finer, more striking.

Lautrec had published his first poster, Moulin Rouge: La Goulue the previous year; it had caused an immediate sensation. His use of bold colours and limited palette, and Japanese influences—pale men clutching staves and dressed in dark colours was a common motif in Japanese art of the time, particularly the woodcuts known as kabuki, which Lautrec collected—were a paradigm break from the traditional, text-heavy designs the French public was used to. He is likely to have also been influenced by the woodcuts of Félix Vallotton, a friend of Lautrec's. argues that Lautrec's style means that "even at a distance the poster is effective. Extreme reduction and stylized presentation of this order—a limited conjunction of lines, spaces, colours and lettering—is characteristic of his poster work".

Lautrec first discovered lithography in 1891, when he was commissioned by the Moulon Rouge to design a poster advertising La Goulue, which launched his public career. Ambassadeurs, his second, saw his style, particularly of caricature—what Horst Keller, director of the Wallraf-Richartz-Museum calls "an exactly calculated mimicry"—honed. Richard Thomson and Anna Gruetzner Robins have argued that "caricature was a way of seeing and judging the modern city" and Lautrec's draughtsmanship in Ambassadeurs is "abruptly effective and expressive". This was one of four posters Bruant commissioned from Lautrec—more than he produced for any other client—it is probable that Bruant realised that Lautrec's bold, clear lines and flat slabs of colour revolutionised poster design. Lautrec established the classic poster design, in what several modern critics have described as the ability to "instantly grasp the attention of the onlooker and maintain it until the communication has been conveyed". This was particularly important in the Paris of the time when posters were displayed crammed together on hoardings; the most effective would be the one that stood out the most. The influence of Japanese printing—whose artists, such as Sharaku, were extremely popular at the time—are apparent in the clear outlines and flat, strong colours, notes Tyler, who also suggests it demonstrates the "perfect" poster design "in its refined mastery" and comparable to the work of Lautrec's established contemporary, Aubrey Beardsley. The early-20th-century art historian Raymond Needham argued that the best Japanese prints "embody all that a good poster should. One dominant idea is presented graphically, beautifully. The detail does not weaken, but actually enforces the motif". Lautrec achieved the effect of having painted the poster by means of bold colours and unbroken surfaces.

The Ambassadeurs' owner, Pierre Ducarre—in Bernard Devir's words, "by all accounts a small, old, penny-pinching conformist"—wanted a more conventional artist, recruiting Georges Lévy. Bruant insisted Lautrec be given the work, refusing to appear further at the Ambassadeurs otherwise. Ducarre argued that Lévy's work was much prettier, to which Bruant told him he could "hang it in the lavatories". (Note: Thomson, Cate and Chapin suggest that Lévy's piece was essentially vapid, doing "little to promote [Bruant's] specific act or the persona he had crafted".) Although Ducarre ran screaming into the street on first seeing Lautrec's poster—he saw the work as a "revolting mess"—Ducarre eventually conceded. However, he cut Lautrec's fee so much that he effectively worked for nothing. Writing to Bruant, he complained that Ducarre was "stingy, and has cut down my price, which was less than Chaix charged for the printing alone. So I am being paid nothing at all for my own work." (Note: Lautrec's biographer, Gerstle Mack has noted that this was not an uncommon occurrence for the artist: Had Lautrec been obliged to earn his living he might have supported himself in comfort, though perhaps not in luxury, by his posters and illustrations alone; but in fact those for which he was paid at all brought in very little, and most of them were actually an expense to him rather than a source of income.)

Ducarre also attempted to circumvent having to use Lautrec's art by commissioning another artist to design the poster. He did not put them up until Bruant's opening day; when he saw them, the singer refused to perform until Lautrec's originals were restored and the new ones removed. Ducarre was forced to comply; Bruant also insisted the posters be put up no later than 15 minutes before he came on stage. The poster was eventually put up not just in the Ambassadeurs, but around Paris; according to Maurice Joyant, Bruant decreed to Ducarre that, "as a punishment you must cover the walls of Paris with it".

== Description ==
Ambassadeurs was originally part of Lautrec's L’Estampe originale album. Catalogued by Loÿs Delteil in 1820 as number 345, Jean Adhémar in 1963 as number six, Adriani, number five and Wittrock P, four. it is a coloured lithograph poster, measuring 59 inches (150 cm) x 39 inches (99 cm) over two sheets of tan woven paper, with some subsequent impressions printed on one piece only. The primary, or key stone, colour is grey-green/olive, overlaid with ochre, red, brownish purple, blue and black; detail has been added with ink and brush, sprayed and dabbed on.

Bruant, dressed in his trademark broad brimmer, red scarf and staff, "his massive frame wrapped in an imposing cloak" was instantly recognisable. The critic Vibeke Vibolt has suggested that Bruant, seen in a three quarter view, is gazing regally past the viewer, perhaps striding towards the viewer. His face and scarf are particularly highlighted, and his well-known expression "half-charming, half-defiant", "part scowl, part knowing smirk". The flat, bold colours push the central figure out, creating depth. Behind Bruant, silhouetted against a dark blue evening sky is a figure leaning against a wall—or lurking in a doorway—and wearing a hat, a working-class figure, possibly destitute, perhaps a petty criminal, hoodlum or sailor, suggesting Montmartre's reputation as a rough, proletarian district—notwithstanding that the Ambassadeurs was in the extremely unproletarian Champs-Élysées. Bruant's scarf—almost a T shape—reflects the initial of Lautrec's signature. It also draws the composition together, as it runs downwards along the middle of the poster while its crossbar highlights Bruant's illuminated face and draws the viewer's eye towards the shadowy figure in the background.

It was printed by E. Ancourt of the Rue Saint-Denis on two sheets using six colours, yellow, mauve, blue, red, green and black. Lautrec's then trademark signature (T-Lautrec) is in the lower left corner. They were generally affixed to walls by a thick layer of adhesive on a back lining. In the late 20th century, they have occasionally been retouched with watercolours for exhibition purposes or repair work.

== Themes ==
Vibolt has argued that in such depictions of Bruant, Lautrec was making a point about social class. Bruant—whose style was brash, loud, vernacular and his subject matter proletarian—was given a regal stare, and harks back to classic aristocratic portraiture. Like, Lautrec juxtaposes the aristocratic-sounding name of the establishment with Bruant's coarse and populist image, emphasising what the contemporary author Frantz Jourdain called Bruant's "fierce, slightly wild and imposing side", deliberately avoiding the realistic representations of his contemporaries.

When [Lautrec] created the magnificent poster for Bruant, which is and remains the masterpiece of the genre, he first painted him in detail as Bonnat might have done. Then to his sitter's utter astonishment and dismay, he deleted and deleted again, retaining only the essential lines. The basic idea remained sincere. Lautrec's capacity for synthesis had reduced it to an epigram. (Note: Although Thomson, Cate and Chapin note that Huc "incorrectly assumed Bruant's displeasure".)

— Arthur Huc, art collector and critic, 1890

Similarly, Lautrec's rough lettering, looking deliberately hand-drawn as it does, reflects Bruant's chanson réaliste style. There is a suggestion of a cheap folk print, and while the immediate impression is one of simplicity and spontaneity, this is belied by the complex composition. Although he successfully conveys Bruant's strength of personality, Tietze argues, he did not romanticize him: Lautrec also suggests Bruant's weaknesses: "the mouth is made to seem too hard, the brim of the hat too wide, the red muffler too flamboyant". Lautrec, suggests Tietze, recognised that Bruant was only impersonating a proletarian hero with a "disguised sentimentality" rather than a "Homer of the faubourgs" as the writer Léo Claretie ascribed to him. (Note: On that, the novelist and critic Pierre Mac-Orlan has argued that Bruant admired the true Lautrec, but recognised that he was a hypocrite: "There was a genius Bruant, author of the chansons de Paris, and a mediocre Bruant who wrote mediocre songs and novels à la ligne in the same vein".) A notable aspect of the poster was Lautrec's technique of partially integrating the (hand) lettering into Bruant's hat. This was a new development in composition, and one, argues Matthias Arnold, un type de composition encore trés apprécié aujourd'hui. By filling so much of the poster with the full outline of Bruant, Lautrec pre-empted the later 20th-century advertising style of pushing the product centre stage. As such, with posters such as Ambassadeurs, Lautrec made an "indelible impact on this new medium, so hitched to the momentum of the modern world". Yet, although Lautrec fills the page with Bruant's silhouette, the uneven lettering―behind him at the top and in front of him at the bottom―acts as a frame. The latter text also puts distance between the viewer and subject.

Lautrec's designs were contrary to accepted wisdom of advertising, which was after all still the primary purpose of the poster medium. Until his Moulin Rouge poster, the acknowledged master of the genre was Jules Chéret, whose style was gentile, "innocent gaiety with a good deal of frilly charm". Ambassadeurs lacks the charm expected of a successful advertisement; although eye-catching, Bruant—supposedly the main attraction—was portrayed almost negatively, "a caricature, with a little mouth fixed in a sullen expression". For example, La Vie Parisienne questioned why Bruant would agree to be portrayed in such a manner, and complained

Who will rid us of this picture of Aristide Bruant? You cannot move a step without being confronted with it. Bruant is supposed to be an artist; why, then, does he put himself up on the walls beside the gaslamps and other advertisements? Doesn't he object to neighbours like these?

== Reception ==
The poster, while not particularly well received by the press, made a huge impact on Parisians, and was almost as popular as Lautrec's original Moulin Rouge poster. The bi-monthly literary review, La Plume praised Lautrec for capturing

The fierce, slightly wild and imposing side of the street singer. He certainly captures this fiercely bitter man with his harsh and poignant talent ... You can see in his face the daring of the gallant rebel and his hatred of the "filthy rich" as well as the sadness born of pain and poverty.

This was despite the fact that by now, in the Champs-Élysées, Bruant was performing to that same "filthy rich". (Note: And indeed becoming increasingly rich himself on the strength of doing so.) Thadée Nathanson, a patron of the arts and owner of the influential magazine La Revue Blanche, who organised Lautrec's first one-man exhibition the following year, wrote how "the posters that have burst forth on the walls of Paris, or are still adorning them, have surprised, disturbed and delighted us". A contemporary art historian and collector, Emil Hannover from Denmark, managed to take a copy of Ambassadeurs—and several other Lautrec pieces—home with him from a trip to Paris the same year. Lautrec's poster for Bruant copperfastened both of their reputations, and for Lautrec, commission begun arriving in greater numbers. Ambassadeurs became so well known that Steinlen used it on the front cover of Le Mirliton the following year, in a Droste effect-style. A bourgeoise is shown viewing the poster in a gallery, while several dogs sniff each other and urinate. They suggest the rough, working-class neighbourhoods the Bruant image was associated with, and the well-dressed individual represents his wealthy clientele.

Ambassadeurs has been accoladed by art critics and historians. Selected art historians have argued that Lautrec, while only producing 31 posters in his career, revolutionised poster design in France. It was since described as "masterly" by art historian Hans Tietze, "unforgettable" by Édouard Julien and "iconic" by Francisco Calvo Serraller and Paloma Alarcó, David Sweetman has argued that Ambassadeurs, while "startling and memorable", does more than garishly illustrate the actor, but "has come to represent the whole world of the fin de siècle cafe-concert". It has been described as "one of the masterpieces of its genre", albeit "brutal" in its frankness. Posters such as Ambassadeurs have led to Lautrec being lauded as "the greatest of print-makers". The art historian Ruth Iskin has argued that its significance is such that it is one of the few posters that have exhibited in major art exhibitions not just specifically about posters.

== Provenance ==
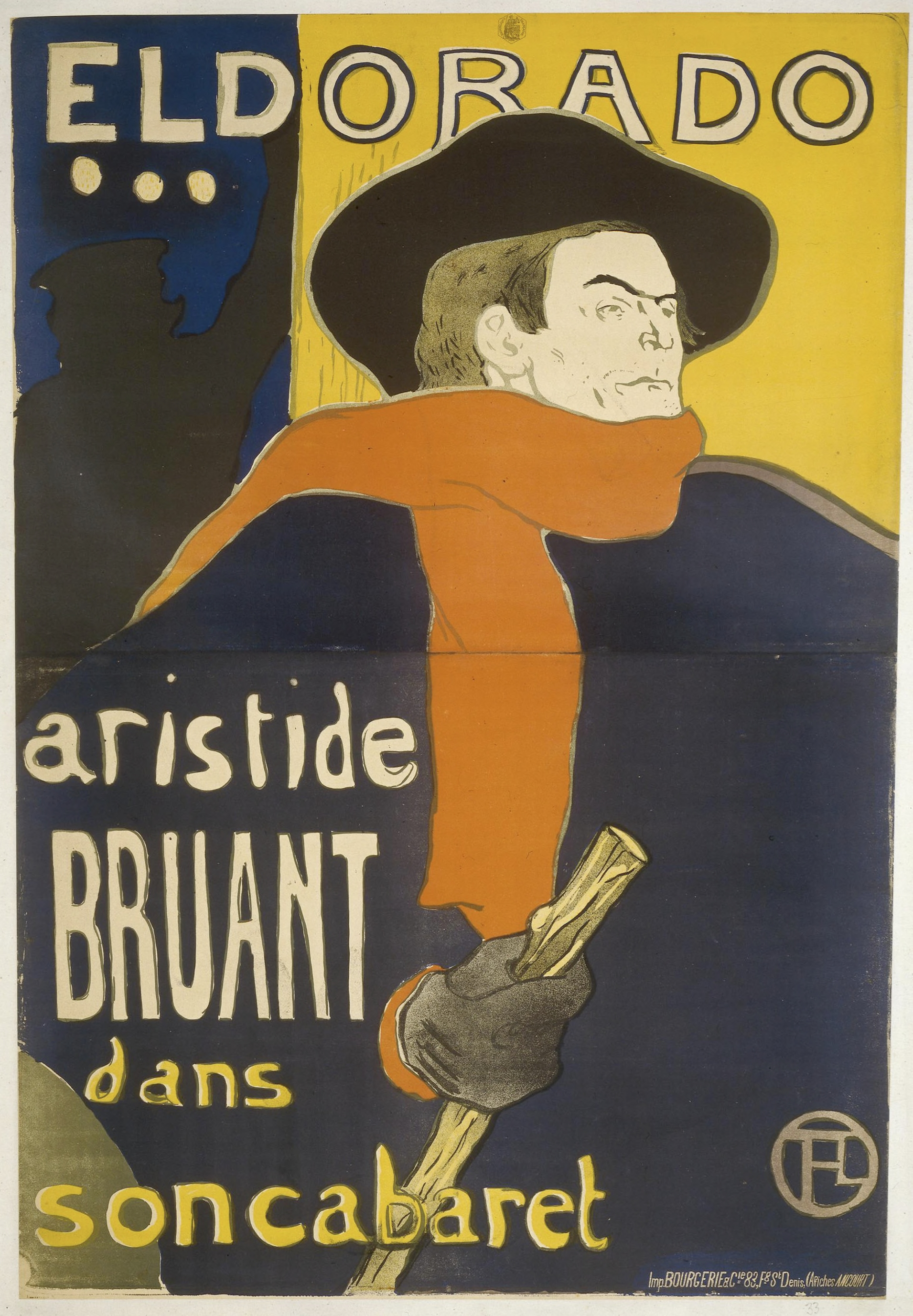
Lautrec's reversal of his Ambassadeurs for Bruant's appearance at the Eldorado

Up to 3,000 copies of the poster were printed. Lautrec left several preparatory sketches of the poster, in gouache, classified as Dortu A.200 (in the Stavros Niarchos Collection in London), Dortu D.3222, D.3445 and D.3446. A large-scale outline also exists―Dortu P.413, in the Musée Toulouse-Lautrec in Albi—for a version that was never produced. Several finished versions survive, part of what Tietze calls a "a picture gallery for the masses". One, also for Bruant but at Eldorado, was a mirror image, albeit with altered lettering, in which Bruant is looking to the right rather the left. (Note: On account of only receiving a reversed version of an extant poster, the Eldorado manager tried to reduce Lautrec's fee substantially.) This was a direct response to the success of Ambassadeurs; the original was by then sufficiently well known that Lautrec simply changed the name of the establishment and inverted the print. In another, Bruant is shown only from the back, indicating, Sweetman suggests, that he was now so famous that the viewer need only see Bruant's props—scarf, hat, staff and cloak—to recognise him. Ambassadeurs was first exhibited in Toulouse in May 1894. The poster was to be reprinted in different versions until 1912, and another smaller one was produced in a limited run, signed and numbered by Lautrec. Several copies exist in, for example, the Albi museum, the Bibliothèque Nationale de France. the Musée de Montmartre and several private collections, such as that of Paul Mellon and Carter H. Harrison.

== Exhibitions ==
- Fiftieth anniversary, United States, 1950–1951.
- The Orangerie, 1951.
- Marseille, 1954.
- Lautrec in the USA, Philadelphia and Chicago, September 1955–March 1956.
- Musée Jacquemart-André, Paris, 15 December 1958 – 30 April 1959.
- Tate Gallery, London, 10 February–15 March 1961.
- Munich and Cologne, 17 October 1961 – 25 February 1962.

== Gallery ==
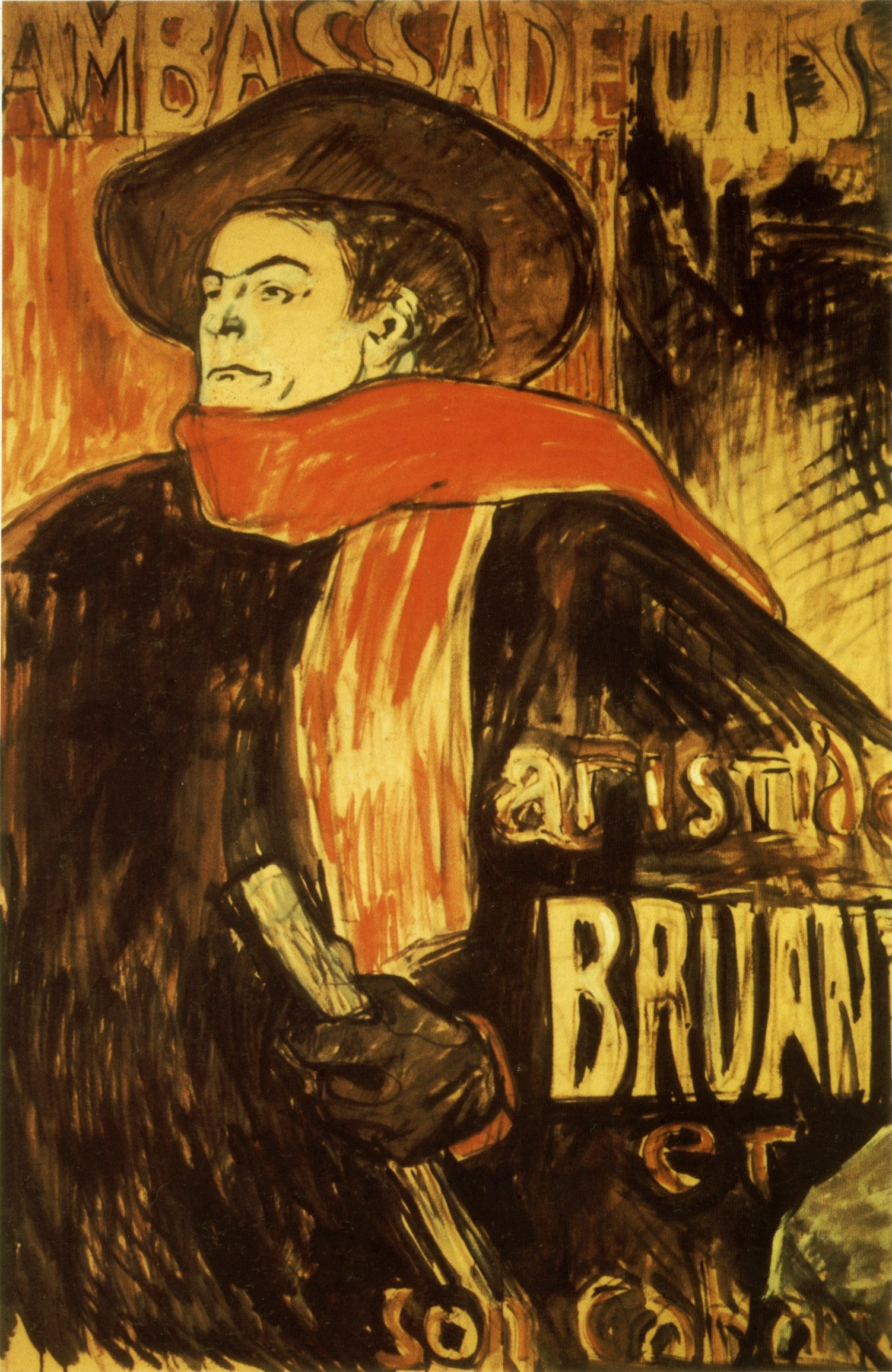

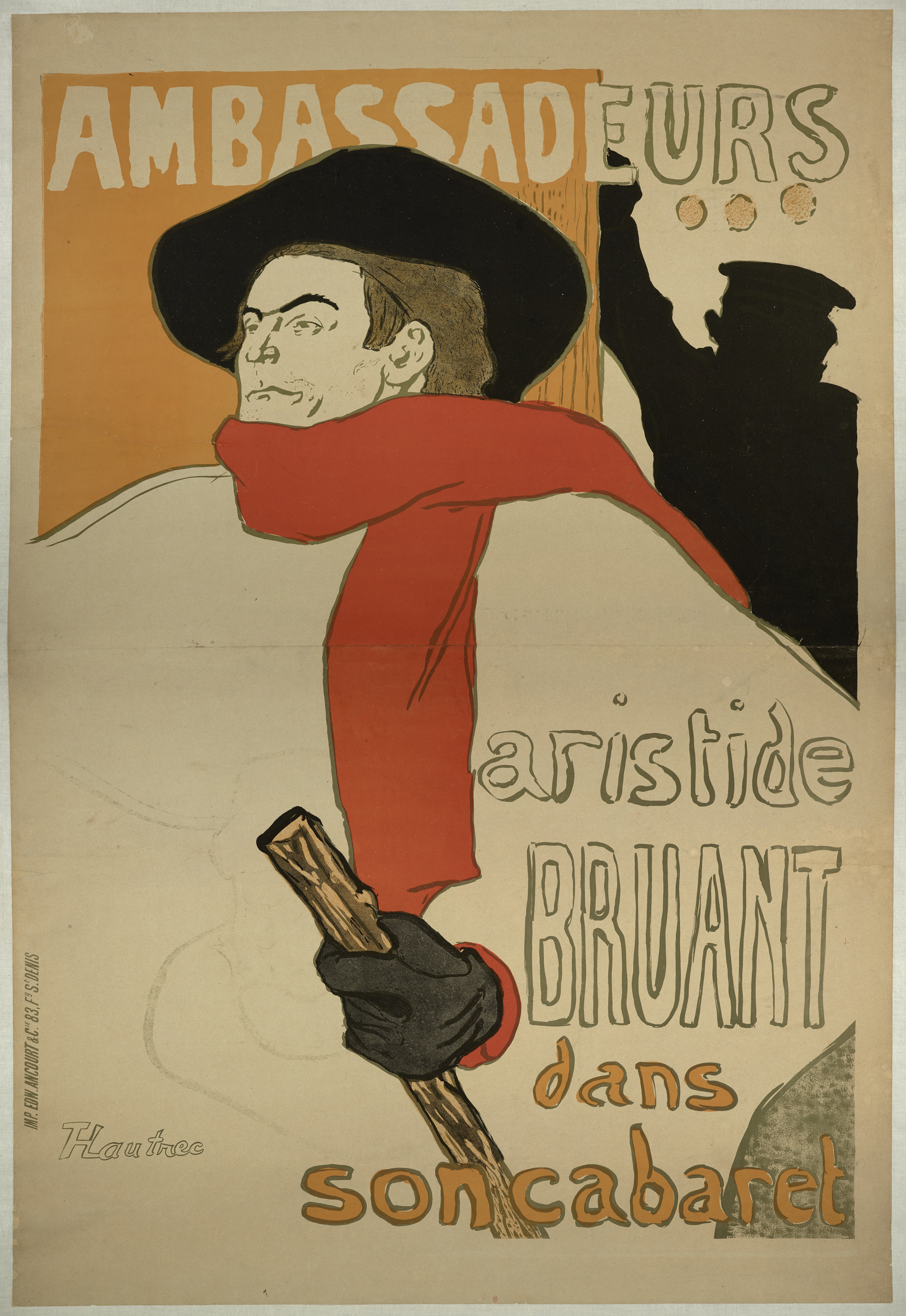

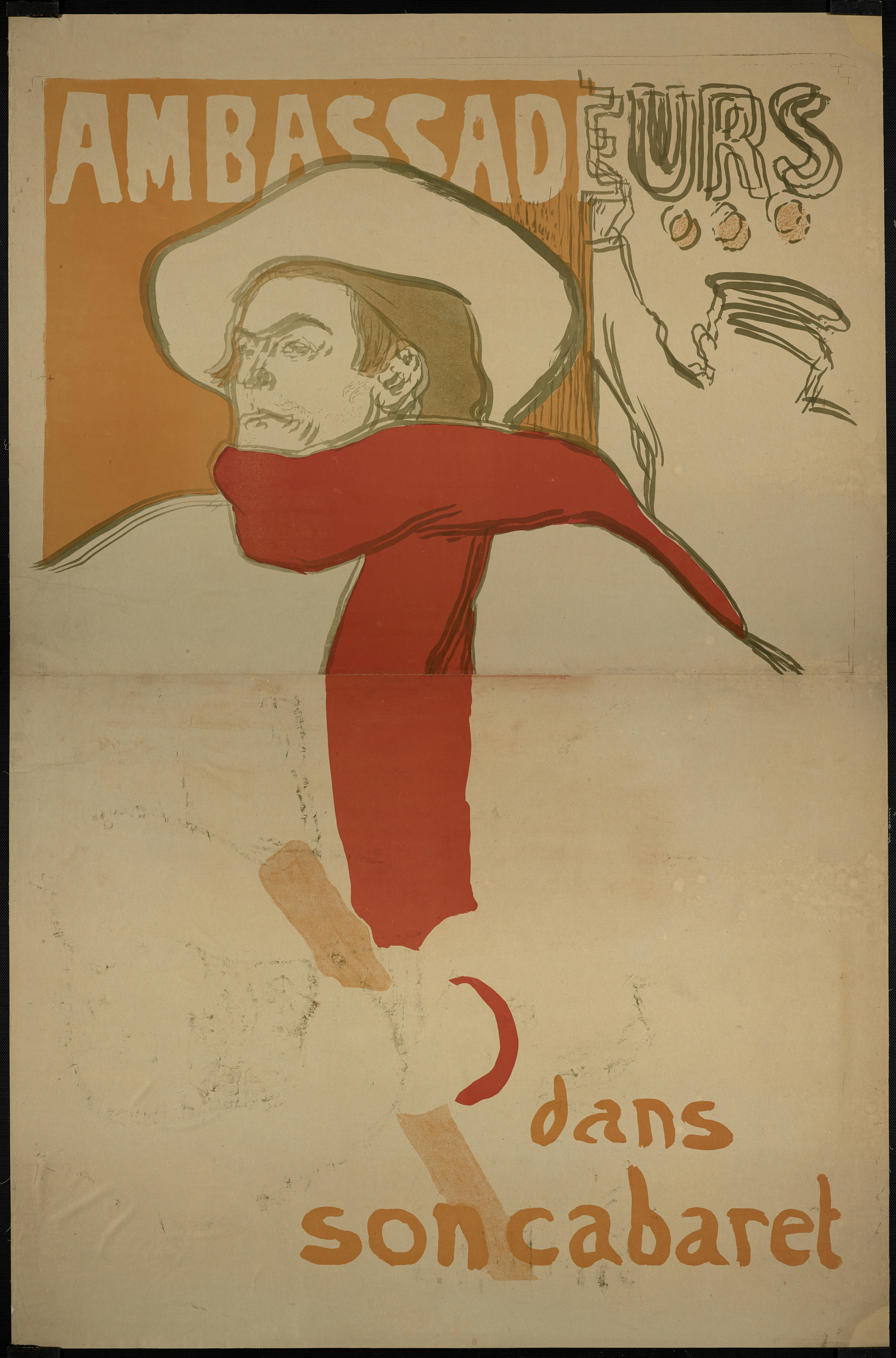

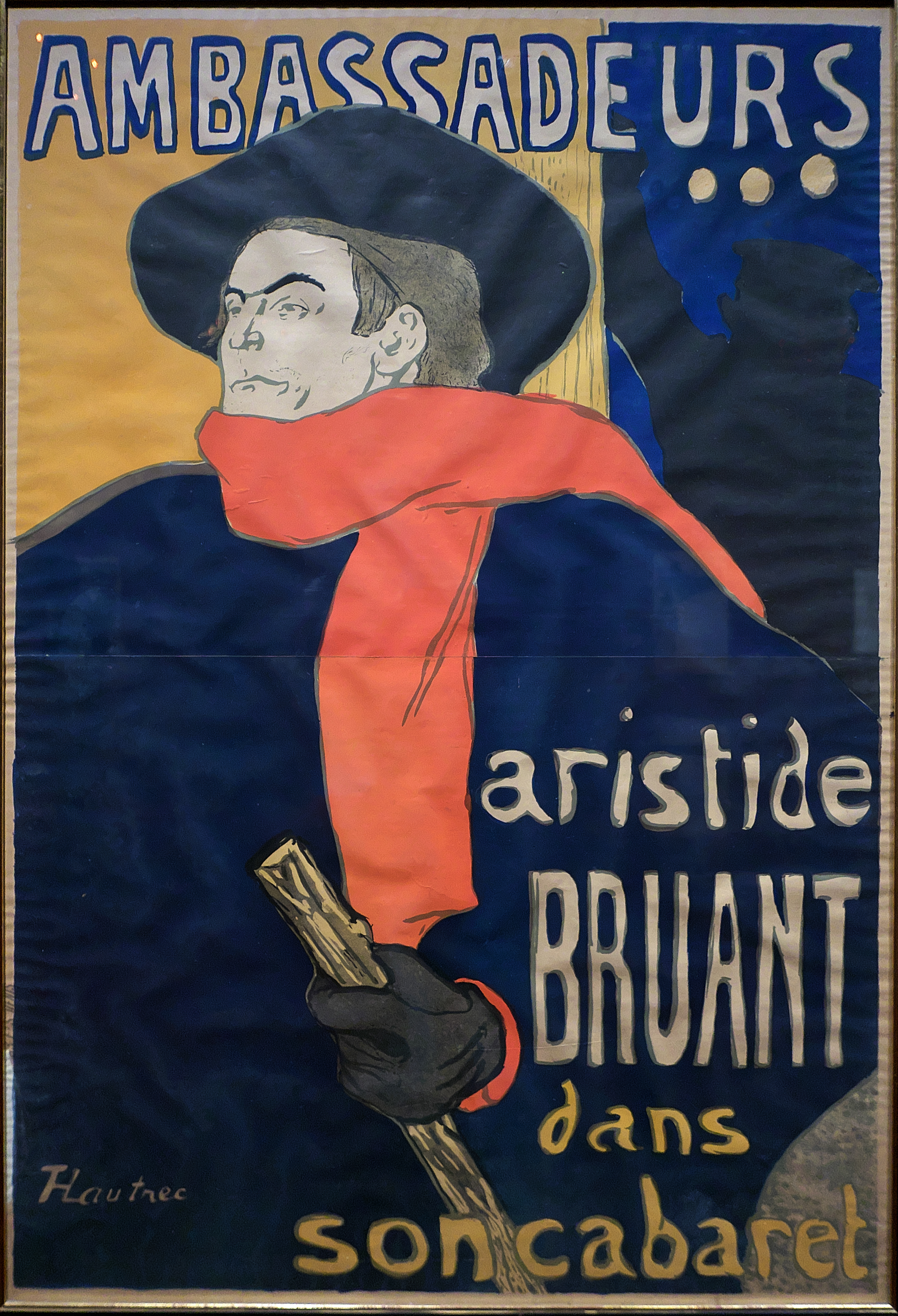
