= Albany Debriège =

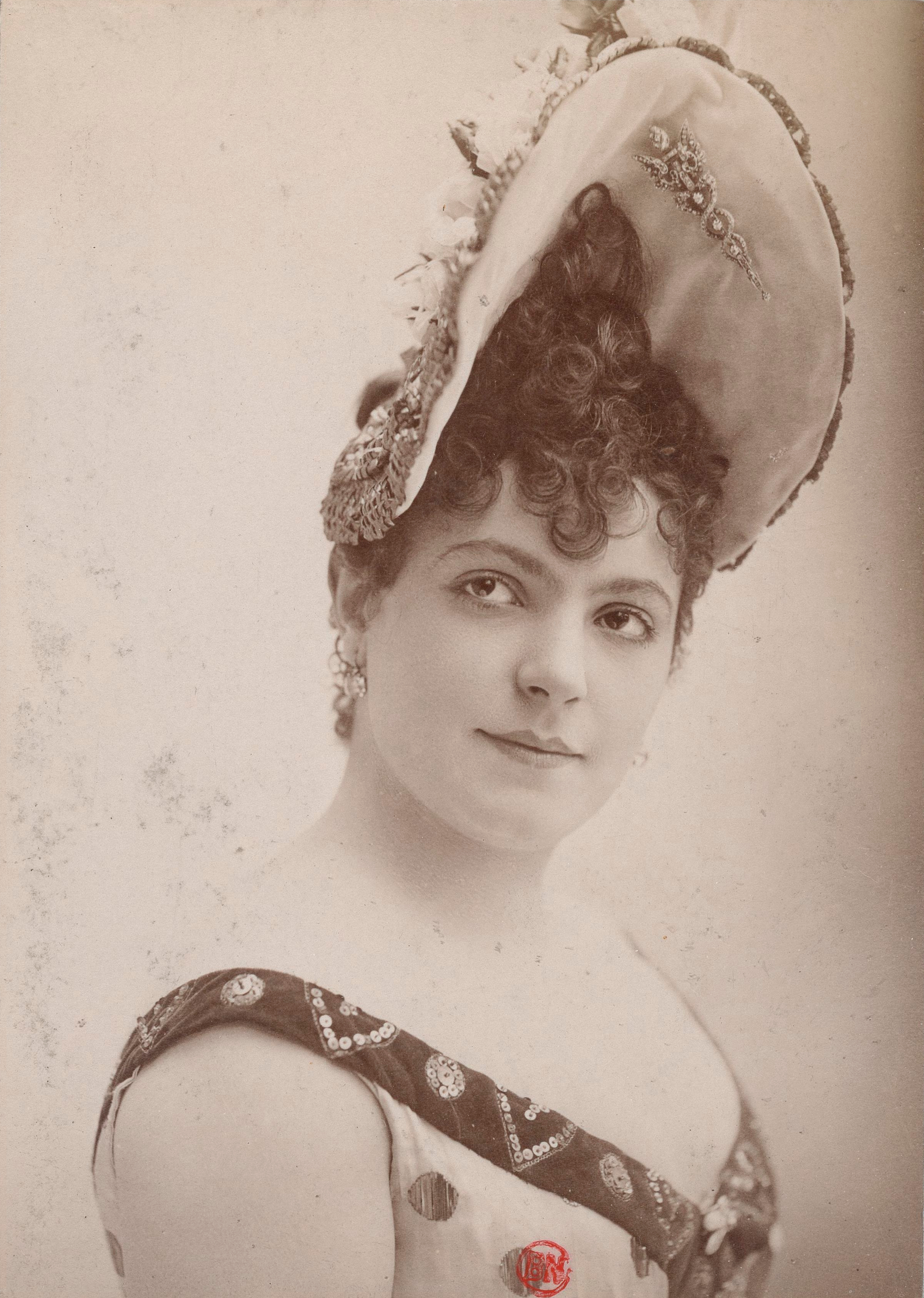
- Born: August 13, 1862
- Died: March 21, 1936 (aged 73)

Louise Albanie Rivière, known as Albany Debriège, (born August 13, 1862, Toulouse - died 16 March 1936, Paris) was a French singer, dancer, theater and cinema actress. She is known for numerous roles, at Nouveautés, at Variétés, at Menus-Plaisirs, at La Cigale, at La Scala de Paris, at the Café des Ambassadeurs.

== Biography ==
Albany Debriège comes from a family of artists. Her father, Auguste Rivière, was the official singer at the court of King Louis-Philippe; her brother, Théodore Rivière, was a sculptor. She had an older sister, Louise Françoise Gabrielle Rivière (1860–1931).

She began her career at the Théâtre des Nouveautés, in the Saturnales. She performed a role in Quel coquin d’amour and appeared on the stage of the Folies-Bergère, where she composed a singing number.

During her career, Debriège traveled all over the world: to Cairo, to Alexandria at the Kédivial Theater, to Germany, to Brazil, to Barcelona, to Romania (1904) and to Russia during the Russian Revolution.

She inspired artists like her brother, for whom she posed for Salammbô, Carolus-Duran, Jean-Léon Gérôme.

She was courted by notable figures in Parisian life such as Jules de Glouvet. It figured prominently in the series of illustrated booklets entitled Les Reines de Paris chez chez nous in 1898 which showed a blurred border between cabarets and demi-monde.

In 1931, she was injured due to a car accident.

== Private life ==
She married Edouard Jean Baptiste Guercin on June 24, 1880, in Toulouse and they divorced in Marseille on March 7, 1889.
