= Chanson réaliste =

Style of music performed in France

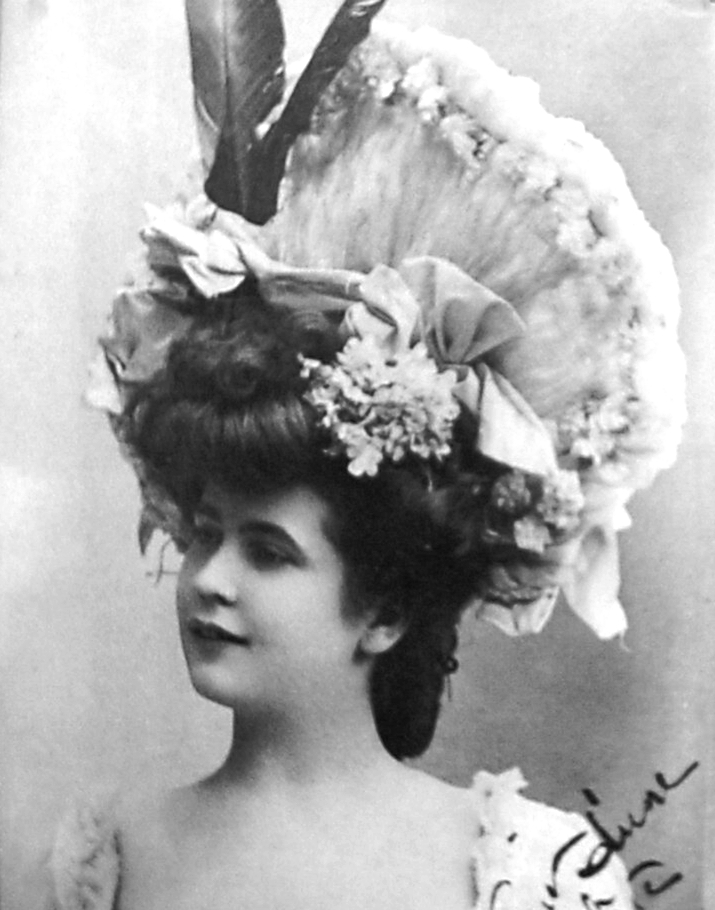
- Fréhel in 1908, an early icon of Chanson réaliste
- Stylistic origins: Music hall Bal-musette; Café-concerts
- Cultural origins: Late 19th century, Paris, France
- Typical instruments: Voice; Piano; Accordion; Barrel organ Bass
- Derivative forms: French pop

Chanson réaliste (French pronunciation: [ʃɑ̃sɔ̃ ʁealist], realist song) refers to a style of music performed in France primarily from the 1880s until the end of World War II. Influenced by literary realism and the naturalist movements in literature and theatre, chanson réaliste dealt with the lives of Paris's poor and working-class.

Chanson réaliste was a musical style that was mainly performed by women; some of the more commonly known performers of the genre include Édith Piaf and Fréhel.

== Origins and influences ==
Chanson réaliste grew out of the cafés-concerts and cabarets of the Montmartre district of Paris during the 1880s. Home to such theatrical landmarks as the Moulin Rouge, and Le Chat Noir, Montmartre became a centre for hedonistic and brazen entertainment from the late 19th century to the early 20th century.

Although chanson réaliste was a musical genre dominated by female vocalists, one of its earliest performers—and credited by some as "the creator" or "the father" of genre—was cabaret singer and comedian Aristide Bruant. Bruant began a career at Le Chat Noir in 1885 and his vaudeville-inspired mix of song, satire and entertainment became very popular with the bourgeoisie slumming in the poorer Montmartre district. His compositions were novel for the time because they included the everyday language and slang used by the commoners.

Borrowing elements of the comédie en vaudeville, the chanteuses réalistes (realist singers [female]) often wore black dresses, red lipstick and white face makeup—their faces highlighted with stark lighting, set against a modest, almost bare backdrop—all done to draw audiences' attention to the singers' emotive facial expressions.

In contrast to the picturesque chanson which was popular in post-World War II France—with its songs of love, cobbled Parisian streets, and the sound of the accordion—the chanteuses réalistes sang songs of loss, hopelessness and abandonment; their songs dealt with life in the poorer Parisian faubourgs, and the thugs, pimps, prostitutes, and orphans who called them home; its themes of poverty and the criminal underworld, as well as its sociopolitical commentary, were influenced by the works of such literary realists and naturalist writers as Émile Zola, Jean Richepin and Paul Bourget.

== The performers ==
The chanson réaliste sentimentalised the plight of poor and dispossessed women, such as prostitutes, waitresses, failed singers in cheap bars, orphans, single mothers and the like. Some of the performers of the genre were also known to have lived the part—both Édith Piaf and Fréhel sang in the streets as children, were teenage mothers and lost their children very young—and many shortened their lives with drugs, alcohol and illness: Yvonne George lived an excessive lifestyle and died at the age of 34; Fréhel became an alcoholic at an early age, attempted suicide at 19 and eventually died in poverty; Piaf suffered from addictions to morphine and alcohol and died of cancer.

However, given the dramatic and melancholy aspects of chanson réaliste, the withered and diseased aspect of their appearance became an integral part of the show. Piaf, for example, was known for her waif-like stage presence and became tightly identified with her role; she was, however, critical of the style:

I don't like realist songs...For me they're vulgar tunes with blokes wearing cloth caps and girls plying their trade on the streets. I hate that. I like flowers and simple love stories, health, joie de vivre and Paris.

— Édith Piaf

Another common theme of the chanson réaliste was motherhood, particularly the mother-son relationship; such songs were a speciality of the singer Berthe Sylva, whose songs dealt with such topics as dying mothers, mothers worrying about their sons at war, sons placing flowers on a mother's grave, and songs about the mundane experiences of a bored housewife.

Other women known for performing in the chanson réaliste style include:

- Berthe Sylva
- Eugénie Buffet
- Germaine Lix
- Damia
- Marie Dubas
- Lys Gauty
- Nitta-Jo
- Marianne Oswald
- Suzy Solidor
- Lucienne Delyle

== Selected recordings ==
- La java d'un sou (Maris Dubas, 1935)
- Une femme (Suzy Solidor, 1934)
- J'ai soif (Nitta Jo, 1936)
- Il n'est pas très distingué (Fréhel, 1935)
- C'est un mauvais garçon (Berthe Sylva, 1936)
- Maison louche (Germaine Lix, 1935)
- Une femme, un accordéon, un caboulot (Lys Gauty, 1938)

== See also ==
- Chanson
- Belle Époque
- Realism in theatre
- Realism in the visual arts
