= Café des Ambassadeurs =

Former café-concert in Paris, France

Coordinates: 48°52′02″N 2°19′18″E

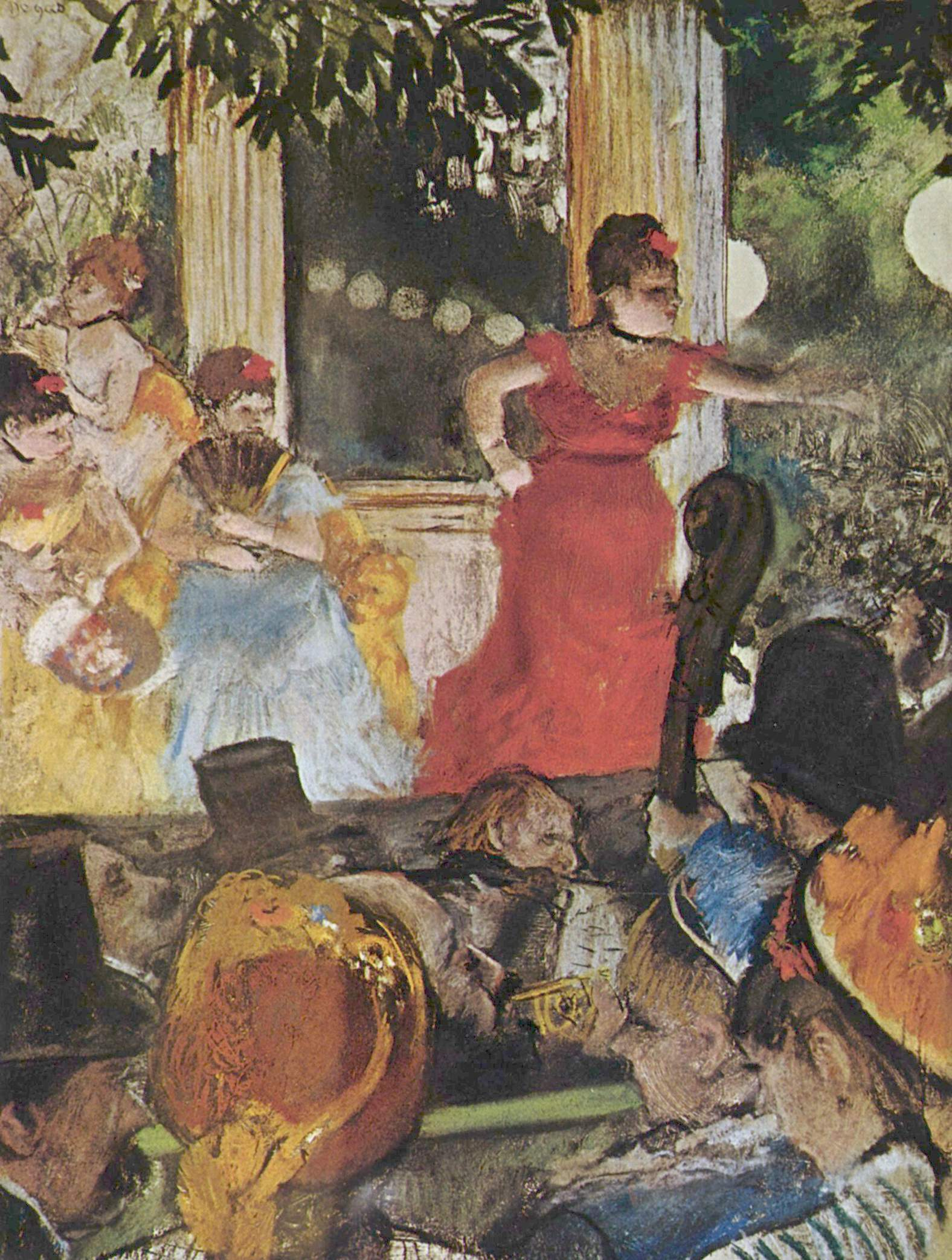
- Café-Concert at Les Ambassadeurs by Edgar Degas, 1876–77

- Location within Paris
- Address: 1 Avenue Gabriel; 8th arrondissement of Paris; France
- Designation: Café-concert
- Current use: Théâtre de la Concorde

Construction
- Opened: 1830
- Closed: 1929

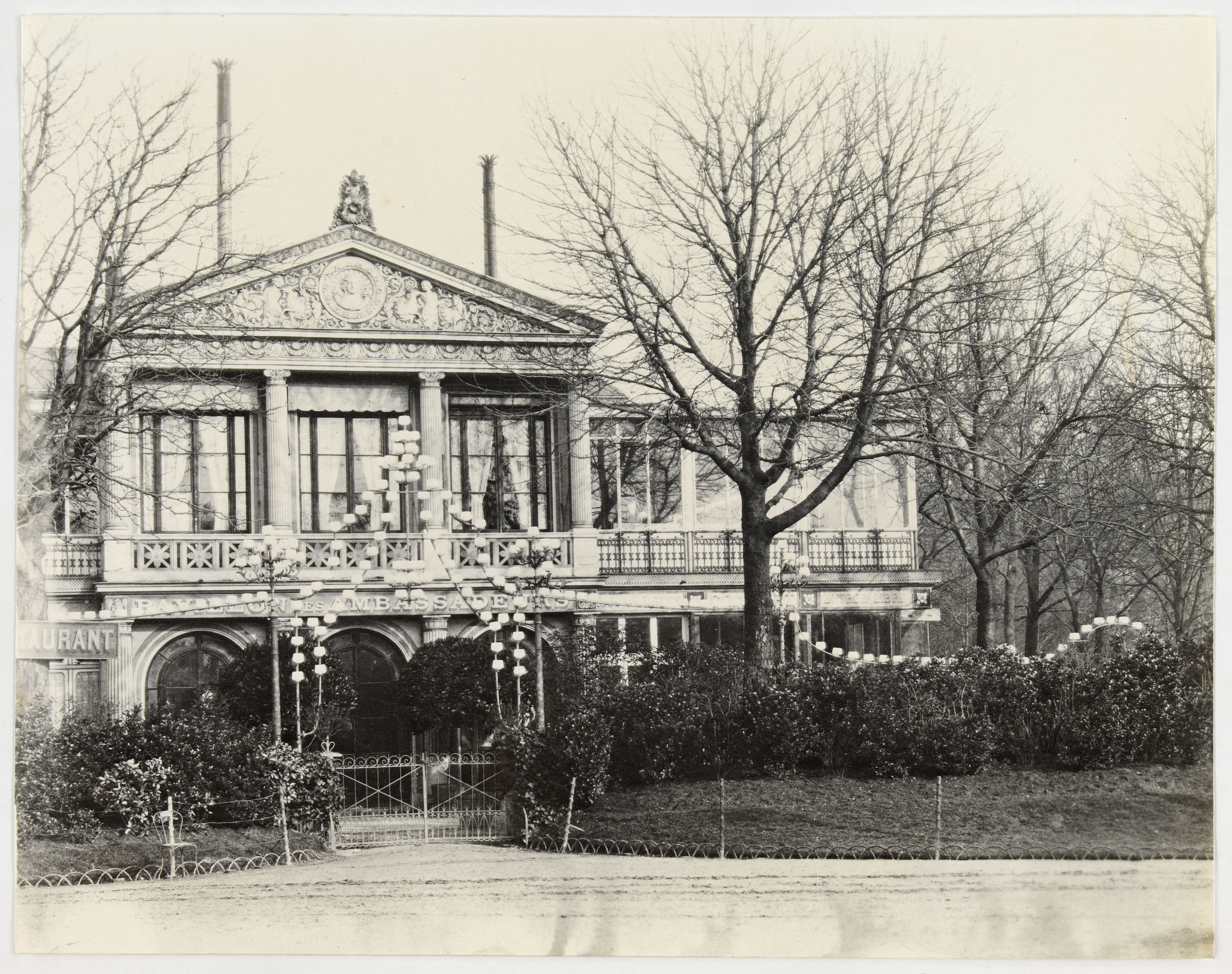
The pavillon designed by Hittorff, known as the as Pavillon Varin, around 1890.

The Café des Ambassadeurs, also known as Les Ambassadeurs or Les Ambass', was a café-concert located in the Champs-Élysées district, at 1 Avenue Gabriel, in the 8th arrondissement of Paris, which opened around 1830 and closed in 1929. Les Ambassadeurs had its heyday during the Belle Époque in Paris when the café-concert became a regular destination of some of the best known figures of art and the demi-monde in Paris. Painters such as Edgar Degas and Henri de Toulouse-Lautrec portrayed artists and visitors at the caf'conc and almost every vaudeville and music hall entertainer that mattered in those days performed in Les Ambass' . In the 1920s, the venue was transformed into an American-style music hall, which had American and African-American artists, singers, dancers and jazz orchestras performing to attract the growing number of American tourists in Paris.

== Early years ==
The Café des Ambassadeurs was founded in 1764 as an open-air café near the hotels designed to house foreign ambassadors in Paris, built to the designs of the architect Ange-Jacques Gabriel. In 1772, a small pavilion was added, and Les Ambassadeurs became an elegant meeting place where people could listen to music and drink, due to the improvements of the Champs-Élysées over the years. Around 1830, it became a café chantant when a few singers and jugglers were allowed to entertain the public on a more or less improvised stage.

In 1840, with the installation of gas lighting on the Champs-Élysées, Les Ambassadeurs became a summer café-concert, whose makeshift stage became a kiosk surrounded by greenery, with tables and chairs set up in front of it. The kiosk was replaced by a more comfortable pavilion with an outdoor stage designed by Jacques Hittorff shortly before 1843, and in 1848 a roofed bandstand to protect the artists was added. In the 1860s, the Champs-Élysées became a fashionable place to stroll, and Les Ambassadeurs was the busiest of the twenty or so cafés on the avenue.

Les Ambassadeurs was situated in one of the most attractive districts of Paris and it's open-air setting had the advantage of fresh air in the summer season, whereas the other stuffy indoor, gaslit establishments, generally poorly arranged from the point of view of ventilation, became suffocatingly insupportable. Most closed their doors for the summer season and the clientele moved to the Champs Elysees, where the cafconc' stars entertained under the trees in the lamplight at the summer Alcazar and Les Ambassadeurs.

Unintentionally, Les Ambassadeurs had a role in organising songwriters and composers and their fight for their rights. In 1847, three authors and composers of music, Paul Henrion, Victor Parizot and Ernest Bourget refused to pay for their drinks because their music was played there without them receiving any royalties. They were sued, but they in turn took the manager to court. This was the beginning of the SACEM (Société des Auteurs, Compositeurs et Éditeurs de Musique).

== Heyday during the Belle Époque ==
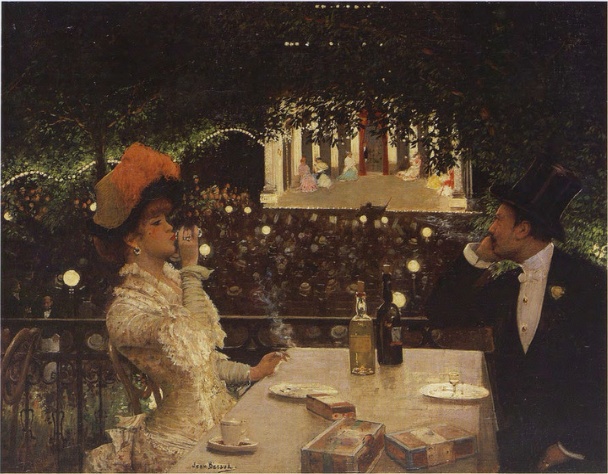
In the Café des Ambassadeurs, painting by Jean Béraud ca. 1882

During the 1850s and 1860s, the reputation of the establishment gradually surpassed that of the nearby Alcazar d'Été, because although it presented more or less the same acts, it was more chic and attracted a more upmarket clientele. With the arrival of Pierre Ducarre, a new director (1874 to 1902), a restaurant was added with the best chef in Paris, which transformed the place into a rendez-vous for gastronomes. (From 1882, Ducarre also was in charge of the Alcazar d'Été.) The café-concert had its heyday during the Belle Époque in Paris when Les Ambassadeurs became a regular destination of some of the best known figures of art and the demi-monde, and almost every vaudeville and music hall entertainer that mattered in those days performed there, such as Aristide Bruant, Zulma Bouffar, Polaire, Paula Brébion, Paulus, Eugénie Fougère, Anna Judic, Fragson, and last but not least Mistinguett and Yvette Guilbert.

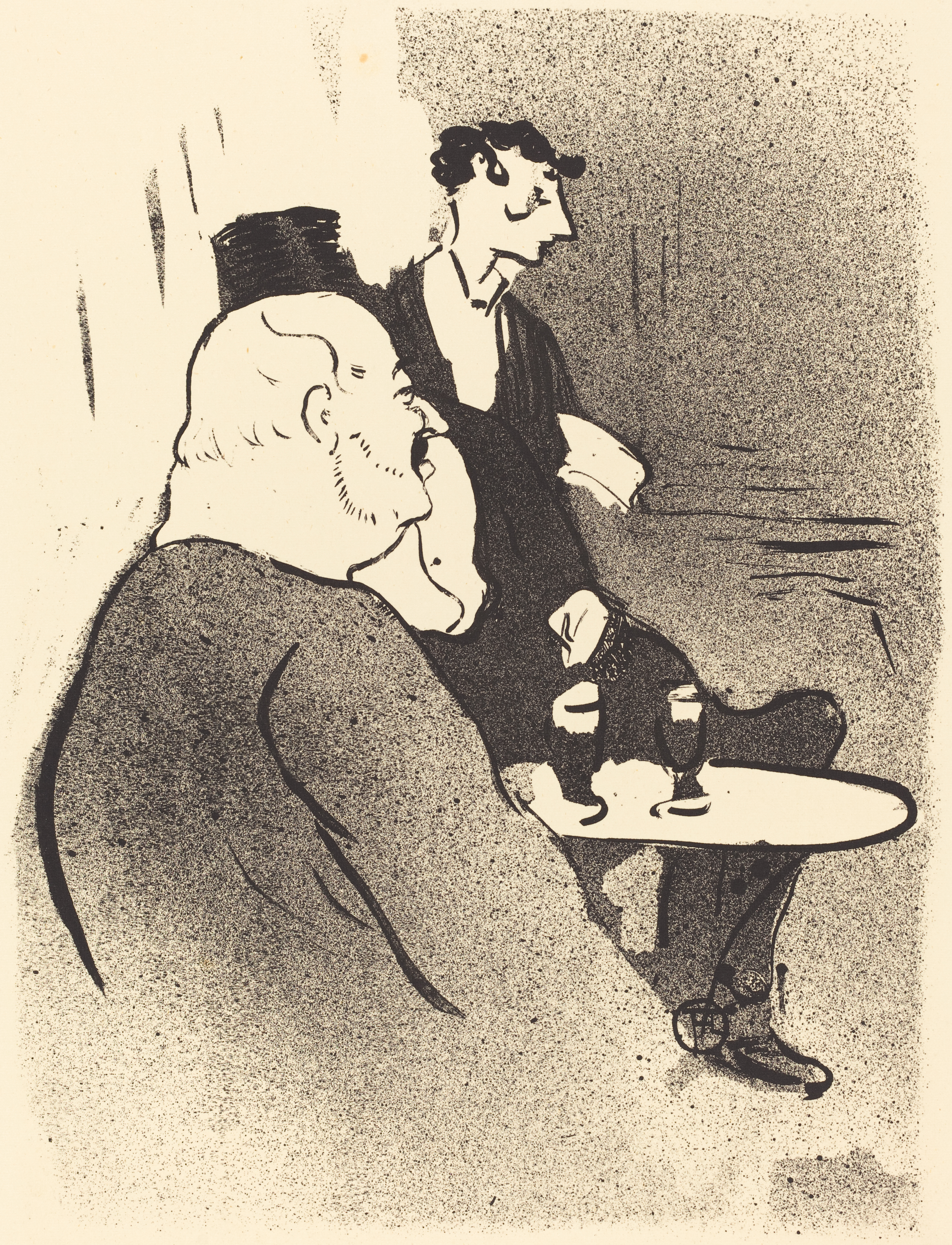
Ducarre at the Ambassadeurs by Henri de Toulouse-Lautrec (1893)

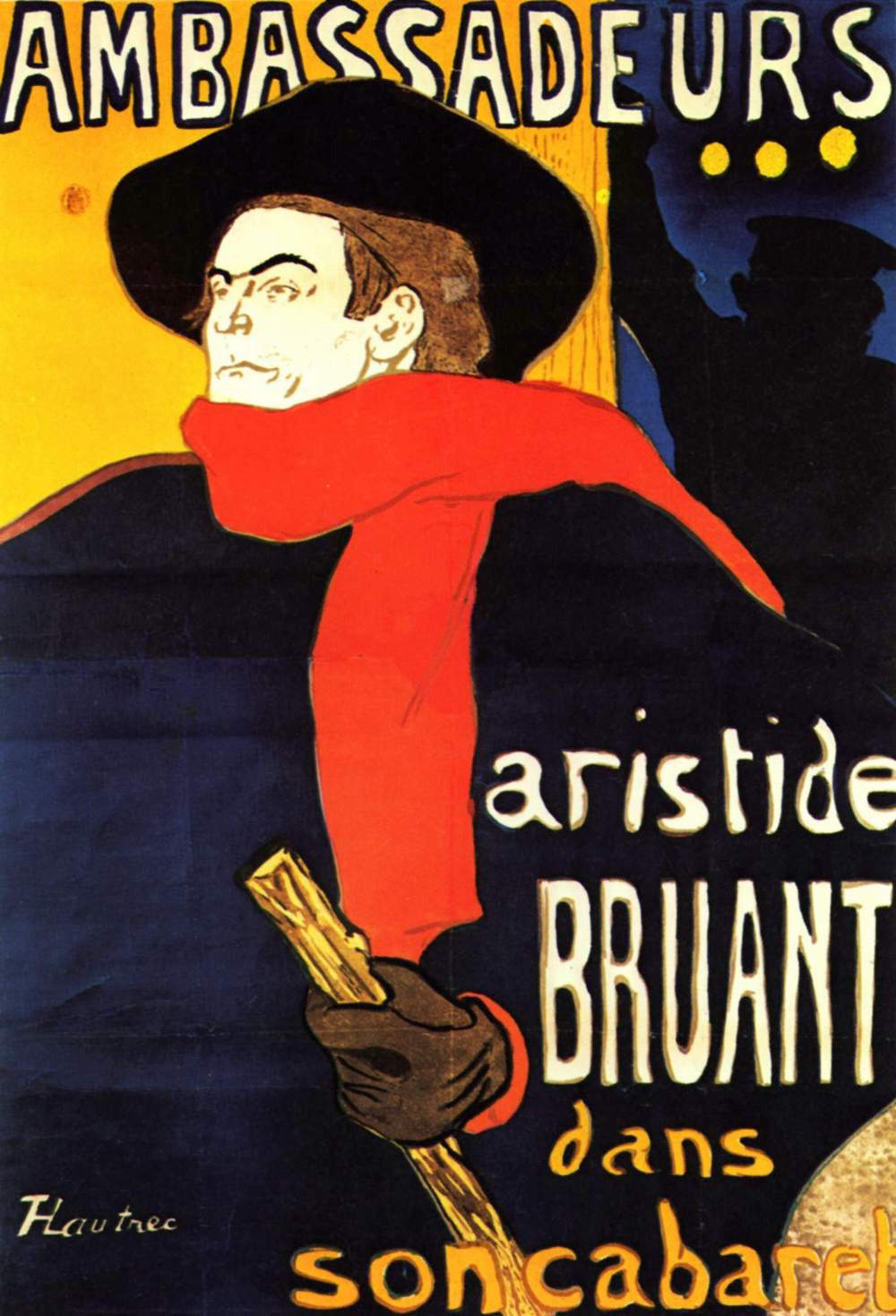
Ambassadeurs: Aristide Bruant dans son cabaret (1892) by Henri Toulouse-Lautrec

Painters such as Edgar Degas (who painted the Café-Concert at Les Ambassadeurs and Singer with a Glove here) and Henri de Toulouse-Lautrec portrayed visitors at the venue. The chansonnier Aristide Bruant, a close friend of Toulouse-Lautrec, insisted that Ducarre should commission a poster of him by Toulouse-Lautrec when he moved to Les Ambassadeurs in 1892. Toulouse-Lautrec painted a romantic and imposing picture of Bruant, with his cape thrown over his shoulders and his famous red scarf around his neck. Ducarre was appalled and ordered to take it down, but Bruant threatened to not perform if he did so. Instead, he compelled the director to cover the whole venue and stage with the poster. When the success of the chansonnier, and of his image, was overwhelming, Ducarre admitted that he had been wrong. Bruant forced him to display the now iconic poster all over Paris.

Of the many artist, Yvette Guilbert deserves special attention. Her debut in 1892 changed the atmosphere at the Ambass' overnight. Before her, the audience was noisy, the artists often heckled and bullied. With Guilbert, singers were finally able to perform in peace. For eight years, every summer, she returned to Les Ambassadeurs. In 1893, she urged Pierre Ducarre to put a roof over the garden, not only to improve acoustics, but also so that the café-concert could remain open even on rainy days.

In 1902, the Ambassadeurs and the Alcazar d'Été changed management. Ducarre, well into his seventies, felt his strength failing him and ended his reign. He was succeeded by his son-in-law, a doctor called Pinard. With little talent for show business, he had to call on two 'kings' of the Paris nightlife: Eugène Cornuché (fr), creator of the famous restaurant Maxim's, and Henri Chauveau to manage the place artistically. During the winter of 1903, the restoration and conversion of Hittorff's pavillon led to some regrettable mutilations. The sole managers from 1912, Cornuché and Chauveau led Les Ambassadeurs until 1923. Inspiring and following the emerging trend in Paris between 1900 and the First World War, they modeled the existing extravagant revue into the breath-taking, exotic, fast-moving spectacle that was to reach its peak in the années folles in the 1920s, while abandoning the café-concert formula to become a music hall.

Posters of Café des Ambassadeurs in the Belle Epoque era

Paris l'été: Restaurant des Ambassadeurs, by Jules Chéret (1884)

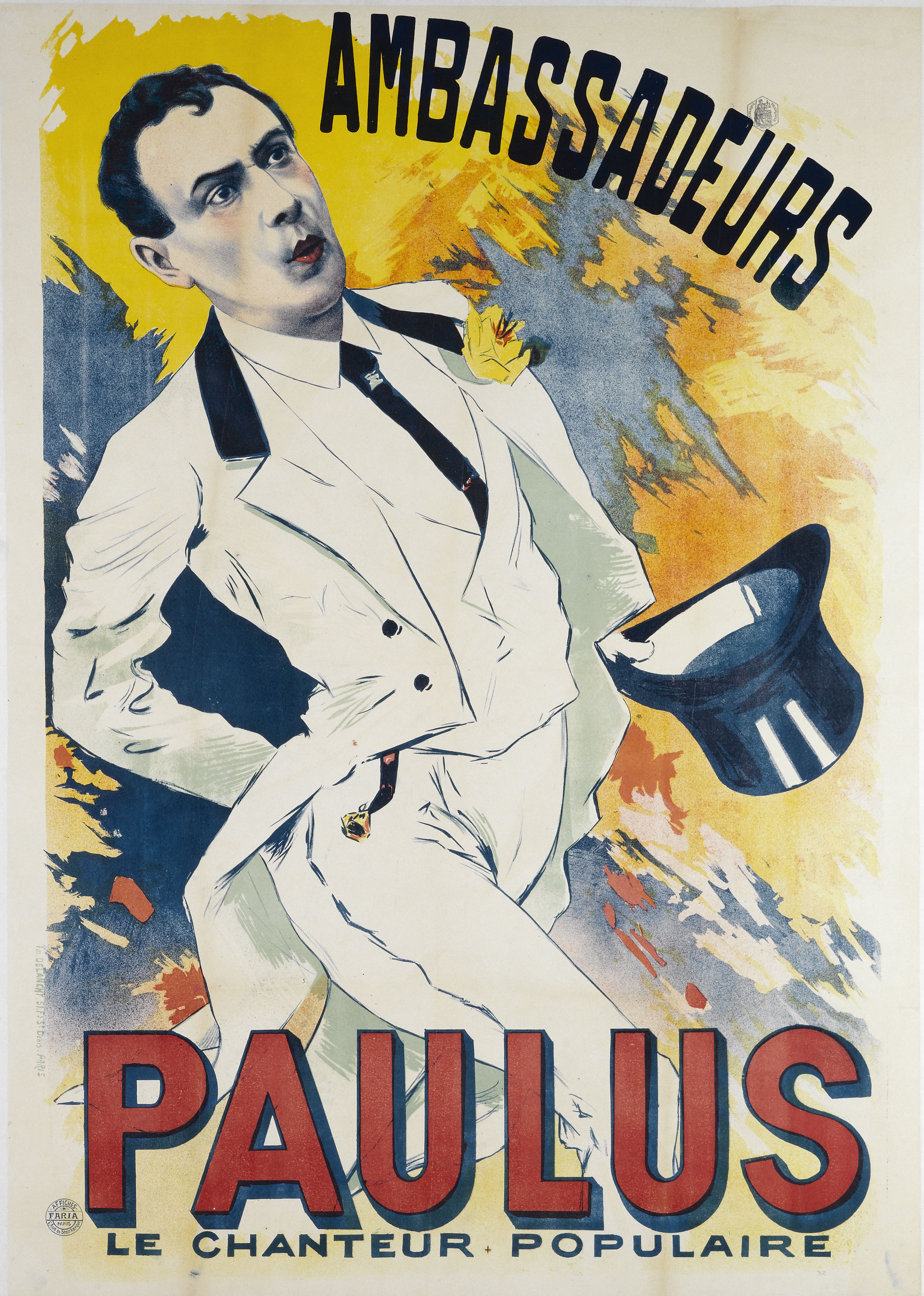
Ambassadeurs: Paulus, by Cândido de Faria (between 1880 and 1900)

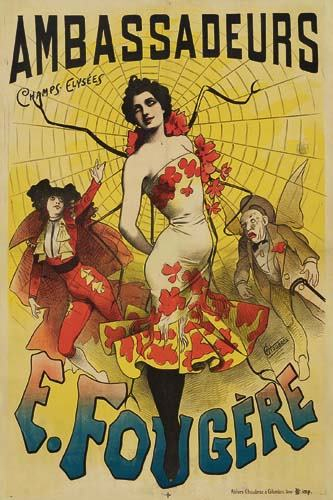
Eugénie Fougère at the Café des Ambassadeurs, by Alfred Choubrac (1890)

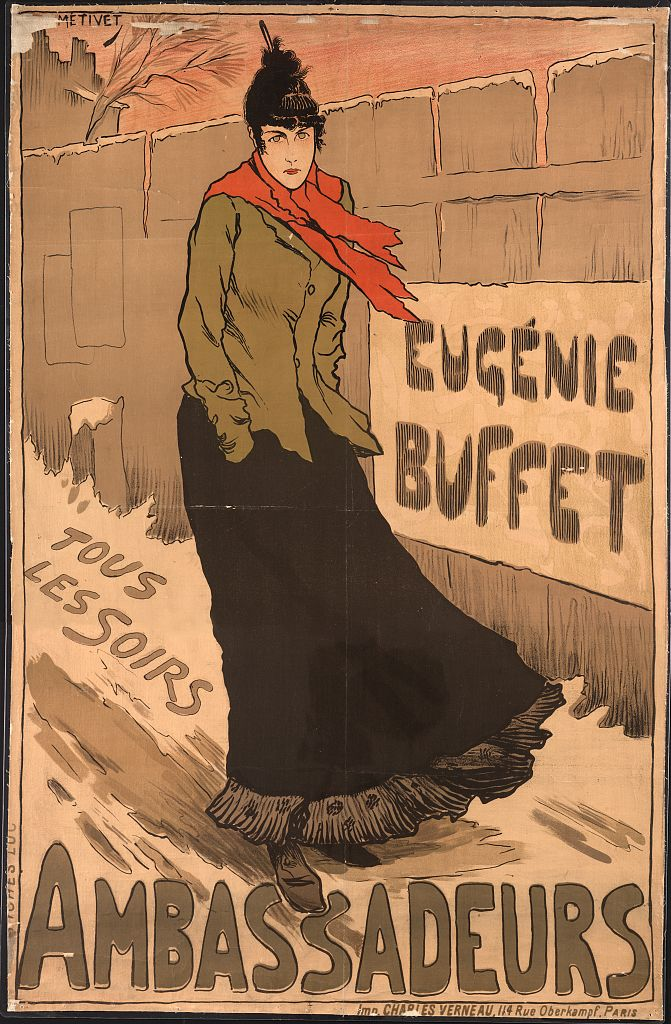
Ambassadeurs: Eugénie Buffet, by Lucien Métivet (1893)

Tous les soirs aux Ambassadeurs Yvette Guilbert, by Henri Dumont (1895)

== American-style music hall and closure ==
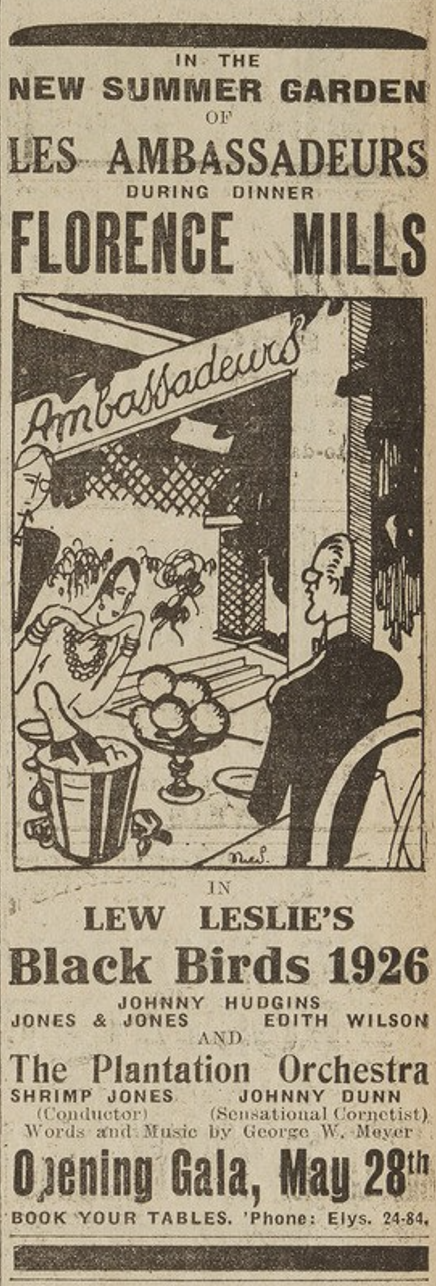
Advertisement for the Opening Gala of Florence Mills and Lew Leslie's Blackbirds 1926 (New York Herald)

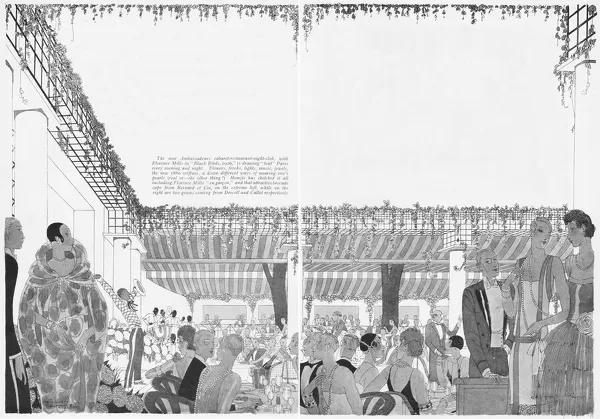
A sketch of the interior of the new Ambassadors theatre-restaurant with the Blackbirds show of 1926 in progress with Florence Mills performing.

The outbreak of the First World War in 1914 changed everything. Les Ambassadeurs reopened in the summer of 1915 with the stars of the moment, but the Belle Époque atmosphere was gone. After several changes in the management, the director of the Casino Kursaal of Ostend, Edmond Sayag, took over the lease of the venue in 1925, with the ambition of transforming the venue into a sumptuous American-style music hall. The City of Paris, which owned the property, allowed this to happen.

Hittorff's beautiful façade was initially preserved, as was the stage, albeit modernised, but the auditorium changed completely. The armchairs were replaced by a dance floor around which tables and chairs were set up that could seat 1,000 patrons; behind the boxes, a gallery; on the first floor, a balcony; the whole profusely flowered by heavy beds of roses, wisteria, stylised plants and intoxicatingly fragrant flowers, stretching up to the roof, giving the place the allure of a garden from Arabian Nights, sparkling with luminous fountains. It was inaugurated in May 1926 as the Restaurant-Théâtre des Ambassadeurs.

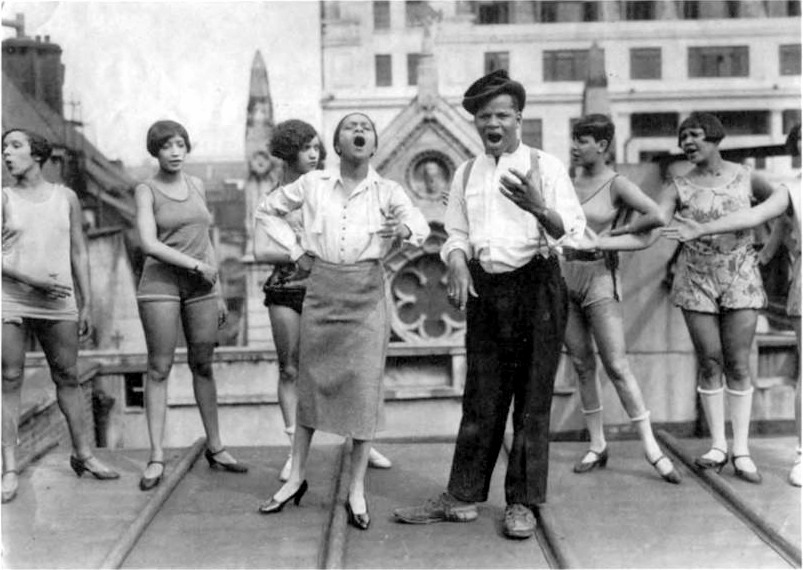
Blackbirds of 1926 – Florence Mills, Johnny Hudgins and chorus girls rehearse on roof of the London Pavilion, where they had moved in September 1926.

The new formula lasted until 1929, and was a real success, mainly due to the arrival in France of excellent American and African American artists, singers, dancers and jazz orchestras, to attract the growing number of American tourists. (Each summer from 1926 to 1929, well over a quarter of a million Americans came to Paris.) Following the success of Josephine Baker in the Revue Nègre in 1925, in May 1926 Les Ambassadeurs imported Lew Leslie's Blackbirds featuring Florence Mills, Edith Wilson, Johnny Hudgins and the Three Eddies with the Plantation Orchestra (led by violinist Ralph "Shrimp" Jones).

The show was a success, especially when the Paul Whiteman Orchestra joined the bill in July 1926. Despite the recognition for the quality of the show, there was also disapproval particularly in the French right-wing press, for the, by French standards, exorbitantly high prices for the show and food and drink, growing discomfort with American tourists in Paris and the fact that the performance was mainly in English and not French, in combination with a certain nostalgia for the traditional cafe-concert.

The next year, in 1927, Les Ambassadeurs, in the Broadway à Paris revue, featured Georgie Hale, Helen Morgan, Johnny Hudgins and Irving Aaronson and his Commanders jazz orchestra, and in 1928, Cole Porter's Ambassador's show (La Revue des Ambassadeurs) and Buster West. In the long run, however, it proved too expensive to ensure the profitability of the operation, in particular with the steady rise in the French franc to the U.S. dollar from 1927, which made Paris less attractive for American tourists and residents. The Wall Street crash of 1929 and the Great Depression exacerbated the problem. The venue closed in 1929 when it was completely demolished and replaced by a theatre built in 1931, also called Les Ambassadeurs, and a new restaurant bearing the same name. Since 2024, the Théâtre de la Concorde has been located on the site of the former Café des Ambassadeurs.

== Sources ==
- Caradec, François; Weill, Alain (1980). Le café-concert (in French). Paris: Hachette/Massin. ISBN 2-01-006940-4.
- Costille, Marine (2016). Spectacles au music-hall. Le cas de quatre salles parisiennes, 1917-1940. Histoire (Thesis) (in French).
- Egan, Bill (2004). Florence Mills: Harlem Jazz Queen. Lanham, Md.: Scarecrow Press. ISBN 0-8108-5007-9..
- Fry, Andy (2014). Paris Blues: African American Music and French Popular Culture, 1920-1960. Chicago: The University of Chicago Press. ISBN 978-0-226-13878-7.
- Gaillard, Marc (1990). Les belles heures des Champs-Élysées (in French). Amiens: Martelle editions. ISBN 2-87890-050-2.
- Leslie, Peter (1978). A Hard Act to Follow: A Music Hall Review. New York: Paddington Press. ISBN 0-7092-0466-3.
- Levenstein, Harvey A. (1998). Seductive Journey: American Tourists in France from Jefferson to the Jazz Age. Chicago: University of Chicago Press. ISBN 0-226-47376-7.
- McBrien, William (1998). Cole Porter: A Biography. New York: Alfred A. Knopf. ISBN 0-394-58235-7.
- Néret, Gilles (1999). Henri de Toulouse-Lautrec, 1864-1901. Köln: Benedikt Taschen Verlag. ISBN 3-8228-6524-9.
- Sallée, André; Chauveau, Philippe (1985). Music-hall et café-concert (in French). Paris: Bordas. ISBN 2-04-015378-0.
