= Singer with a Glove =

Pastel by Edgar Degas

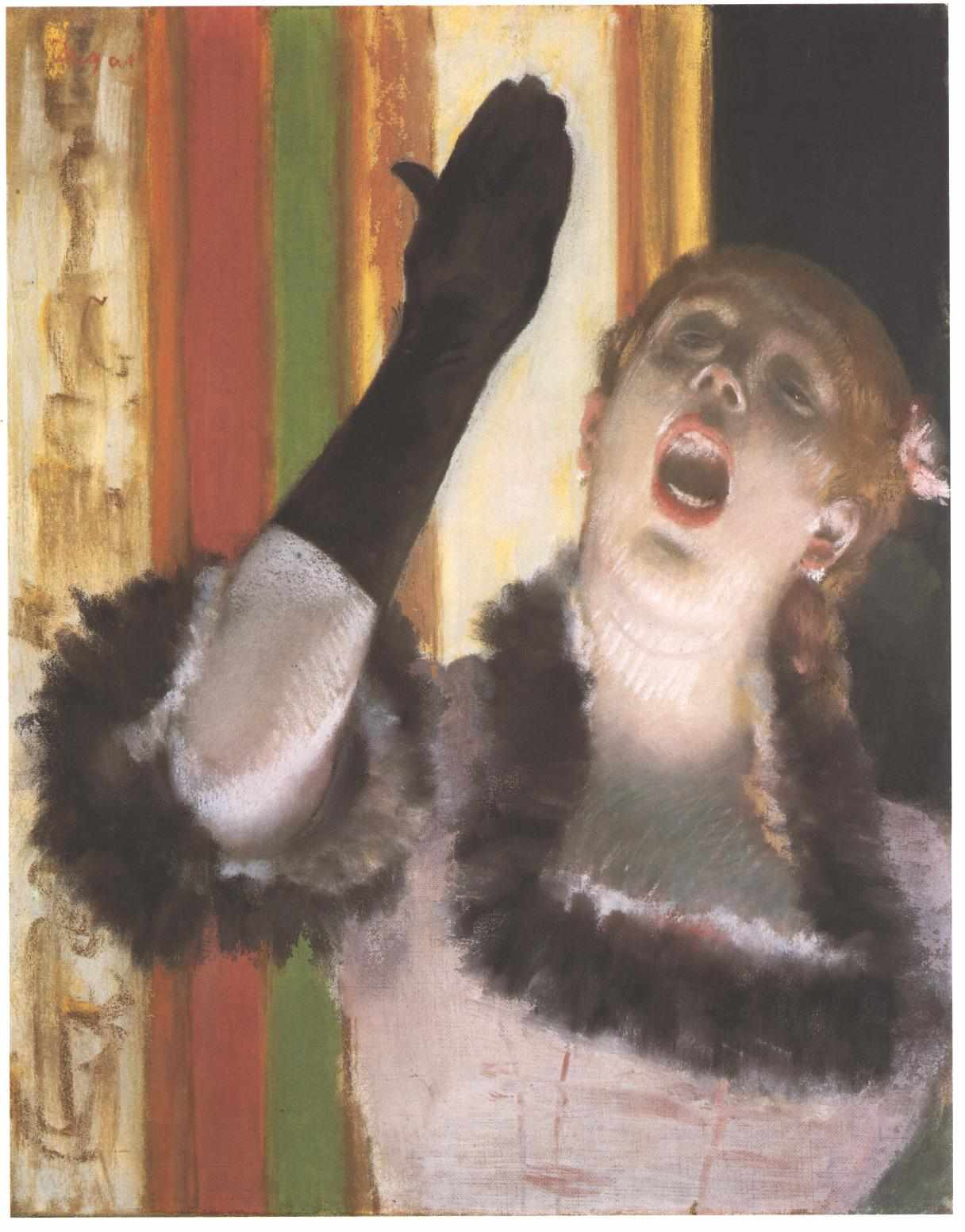
Edgar Degas, Singer with a Glove, 1878, Fogg Museum

Singer with a Glove by Edgar Degas, originally titled Chanteuse de Café, la chanteuse au gant, is an 1878 pastel drawing on canvas 53.2 x 41 cm. Degas was a French artist known for his pastels, paintings, sculptures, prints, and charcoal drawings. This pastel is part of a series of works that have cafe-concert singers as their subject. Degas was a habitué of those places, especially the Café des Ambassadeurs, and he uses them as the settings for many of his works.

Ballet Rehearsal (1873) and The Ballet Class (1874) also depict performers both on stage and in practice. Degas is especially identified with the subject of dance; more than half of his works depict dancers alone. He is regarded as one of the founders of Impressionism, although he rejected the term, and preferred to think of himself as a realist. Singer with a Glove has been in the Fogg Museum collection since 1951. The Fogg Museum, which is associated with Harvard University along with two other museums and four research centers, has a permanent Degas exhibition with nearly 70 pieces in the collection. The Fogg was the first museum to mount an exhibition of works by Degas, which became a pivotal moment in his lifetime. At the first Fogg showing attendance reached 550, which at the time was considered a success.

== Composition ==
Singer with a Glove consists of bright and dark colors. The singer, who has a pale complexion, wears a black-glove and pink toned dress. In the background there are long washes of orange-red, light green, and pale yellow. There are scribbles of light reflecting white onto the woman's arm, chest, and face, and the black around the dress's neckline and sleeve imply feathers without showing individual feathers or lines. Her face holds an operatic note, her eyes focus on her raised gloved-hand, and her red hair is pulled back into a low bun. A dark shadow is cast over her eyes and top of her head. The singer's hair is coiffed and includes a flower, she has jewels for earrings, and her dress includes a bodice.
