= Café-Concert at Les Ambassadeurs =

Pastel by Edgar Degas

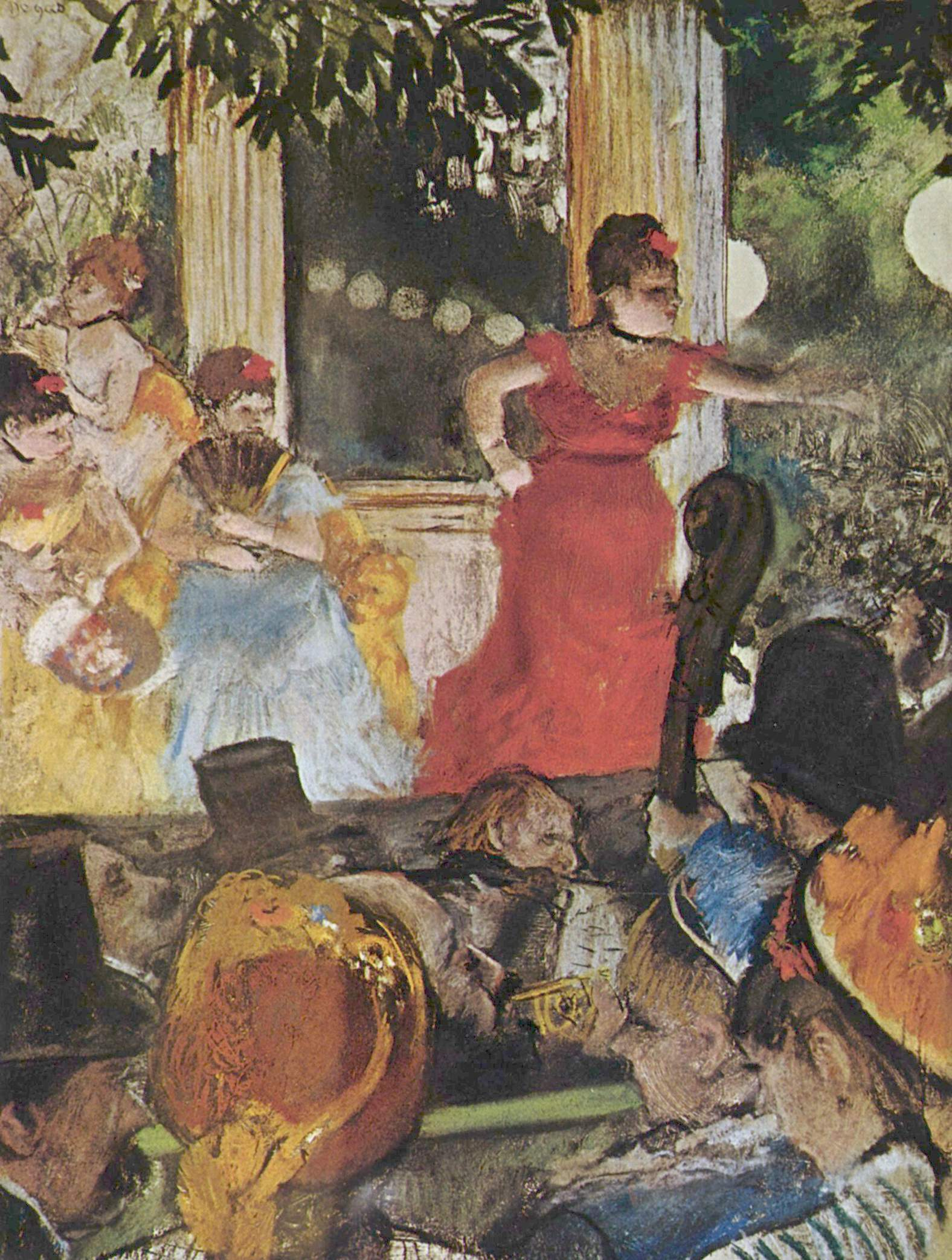
- Artist: Edgar Degas
- Year: 1876-1877
- Medium: Pastel on monotype
- Dimensions: 37 cm × 27 cm (15 in × 11 in)
- Location: Museum of Fine Arts of Lyon, Lyon
- Website: Official website

Café-Concert at Les Ambassadeurs (French: Le Café-concert aux ambassadeurs) is a monotype pastel by Edgar Degas of the cafe-concert at the Café des Ambassadeurs café-concert. It was first exhibited in 1877 at an Impressionist exhibition and is now in the Musée des Beaux-Arts de Lyon. A later version of 1885 is now in the Musée d'Orsay.

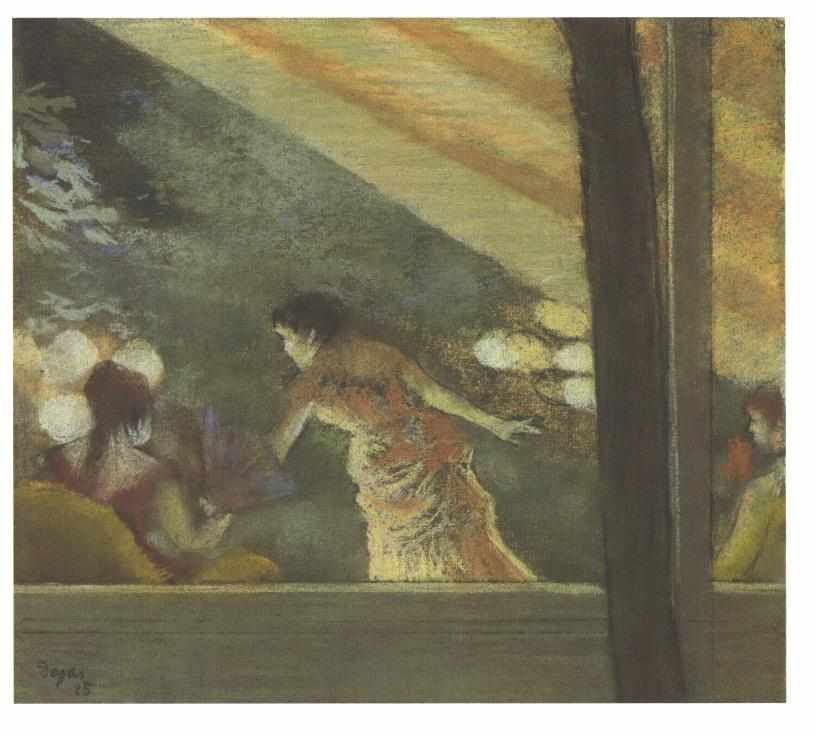
Au café concert des Ambassadeurs, 1885, pastel on monotype, Musée d'Orsay
