= Aristide Bruant =

French cabaret singer, comedian, and nightclub owner (1851–1925)

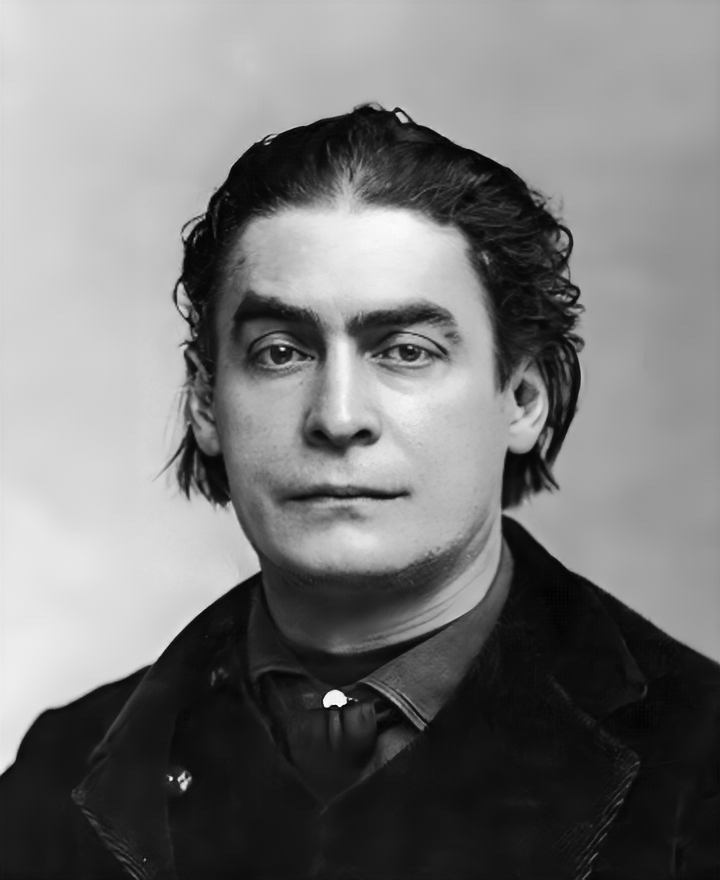
- Portrait by Nadar, c. 1898

Background information
- Birth name: Louis Armand Aristide Bruand
- Born: 6 May 1851; Courtenay, Loiret, France
- Died: 11 February 1925 (aged 73); Paris, France
- Genres: Creator of the chanson réaliste
- Occupation(s): Singer, entertainer and writer

Aristide Bruant (French: [aʁistid bʁyɑ̃]; 6 May 1851 – 11 February 1925) was a French cabaret singer, comedian, and nightclub owner. He is best known as the man in the red scarf and black cape featured on certain famous posters by Henri de Toulouse-Lautrec. He has also been credited as the creator of the chanson réaliste musical genre.

== Biography ==
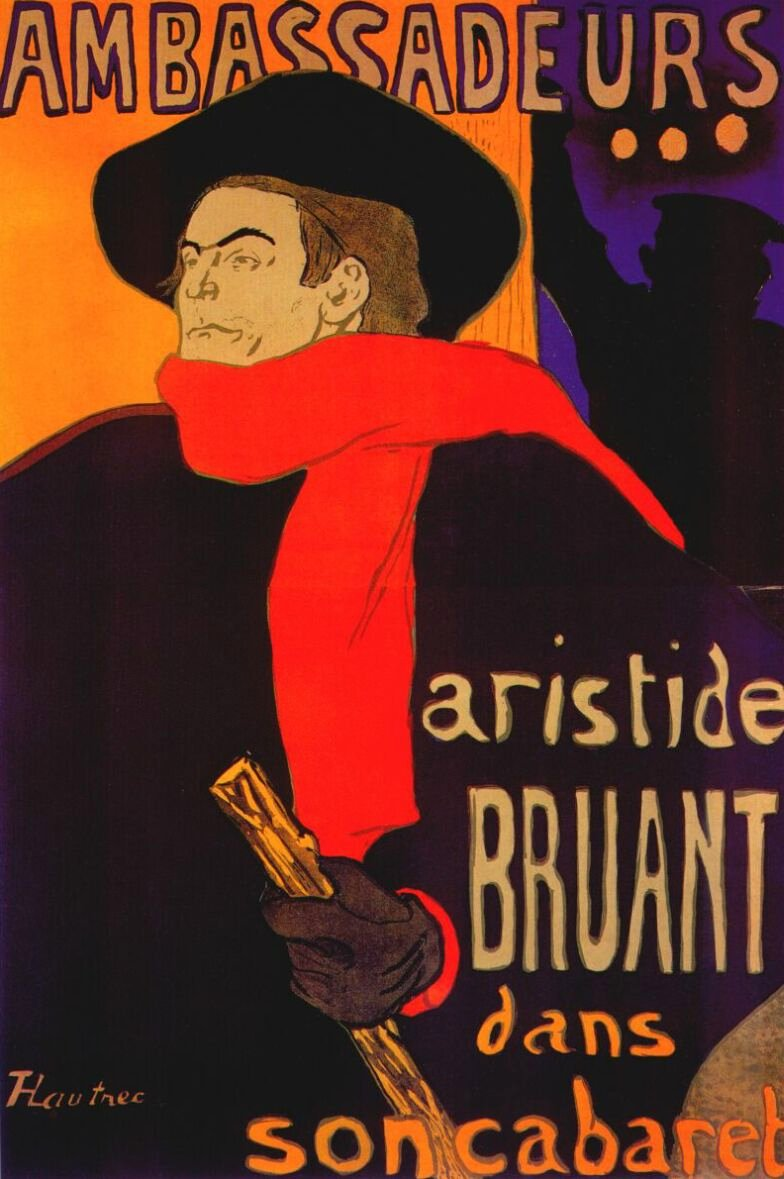
Ambassadeurs, Aristide Bruant by Henri de Toulouse-Lautrec

Born Louis Armand Aristide Bruand in the village of Courtenay, Loiret in France, Bruant left his home in 1866 at age fifteen, following his father's death, to find employment. Making his way to the Montmartre Quarter of Paris, he hung out in the working-class bistros, where he finally was given an opportunity to show his musical talents. Although bourgeois by birth, he soon adopted the earthy language of his haunts, turning it into songs that told of the struggles of the poor.

Bruant began performing at cafe-concerts and developed a singing and comedy act that led to his being signed to appear at the Le Chat Noir club. Dressed in a red shirt, black velvet jacket, high boots, and a long red scarf, and using the stage name Aristide Bruant, he soon became a star of Montmartre, and when Henri de Toulouse-Lautrec began showing up at the cabarets and clubs, Bruant became one of the artist's first friends. Toulouse-Lautrec designed the now iconic poster of Bruant, with his cape thrown over his shoulders and his famous red scarf around his neck, when he moved to the Café des Ambassadeurs in 1892.

In 1885, Bruant opened his own Montmartre club, a place he called "Le Mirliton" (The Reed Pipe). Although he hired other acts, Bruant put on a singing performance of his own. As the master of ceremonies for the various acts, he used the comedy of the insult to poke fun at the club's upper-crust guests who were out "slumming" in Montmartre. His vaudeville-inspired mix of song, satire and entertainment developed into the musical genre called chanson réaliste (realist song). He also published a magazine called Le Mirliton, in which he printed illustrations and paintings by Lautrec.

Bruant died in Paris and was buried in the cemetery of Subligny, near his birthplace in the departement of Loiret.

Rue Bruant in the 13th arrondissement of Paris was not named after him, but after the architect Libéral Bruant (1637-1697) whose designed a church on the grounds of the Salpêtrière hospital just north of the street.

== Songs ==
Some of Bruant's better known songs include:

- Nini Peau d'Chien
- A la Bastille
- A la Villette
- Meunier tu es cocu
- A Batignolles
- Serrez Vos Rangs
- A la Roquette
- La chanson des Michetons
- A Poissy
- A la Place Maubert
- Les petits joyeux
- Belleville-Menilmontant
- La Greviste
- Le Chat Noir
- Les Mômes de la Cloche

== Sources ==
- Conway, Kelly (2004). Chanteuse in the City: The Realist Singer in French Film. Berkeley: University of California Press. ISBN 0-520-24407-9.
- Moore Whiting, Steven (1999). Satie the Bohemian: From Cabaret to Concert Hall. Oxford: Oxford University Press. ISBN 0-19-816458-0.
- Néret, Gilles (1999). Henri de Toulouse-Lautrec, 1864-1901. Köln: Benedikt Taschen Verlag. ISBN 3-8228-6524-9.
- Robb, David (2007). Protest Song in East and West Germany Since the 1960s. Rochester, N.Y.: Camden House. ISBN 978-1-57113-281-9.
- Schechter, Joel (2003). Popular Theatre: A Sourcebook. London/New York: Routledge. ISBN 0-415-25830-8.
- Wilson, Elizabeth (2000). Bohemians: The Glamorous Outcasts. New Brunswick, NJ: Rutgers University Press. ISBN 0-8135-2894-1.
