= Les Mômes de la cloche =

Song by Édith Piaf (originally credited to La môme Piaf)
- Language: French
- Written: Vincent Scotto (music), André Decaye (lyrics)
- Released: January 1936
- Recorded: October-December 1935
- Label: Polydor

"Les Mômes de la cloche" is a song which became the first studio recording made by Édith Piaf. It was written by Vincent Scotto (music) and André Decaye (lyrics).

== History ==
Édith Piaf recorded the song "Les Mômes de la cloche" on 18 December 1935 at Polydor's Studio 2. The song was released as her first commercial record (a 78 RPM single) in 1936. The other side of the record was "L'étranger". (Actually, Piaf re-recorded both songs later, "L'étranger" on 13 January 1936 and "Les Mômes de la cloche" on 24 March 1936, and some pressings of the single used the new versions.)

The 78 RPM record with the song became a big success.

== Track listings ==
10" shellac single "Les mômes de la cloche / L’étranger" Polydor 524 157 (January 1936, France)

A. "Les mômes de la cloche"

(Vincent Scotto – Decaye)

B. "L’étranger"

(Juel – Monnot – Malleron)
