= Café-chantant =

Type of musical establishment associated with the belle époque in France

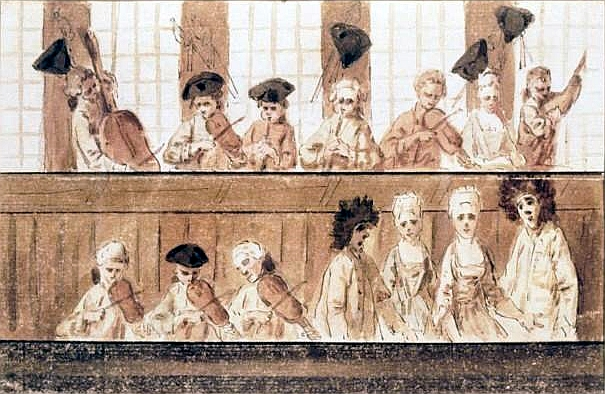
The first café-chantant was established in 1789 on the Champs-Élysées (ink drawing from the collection of Hippolyte Destailleur)

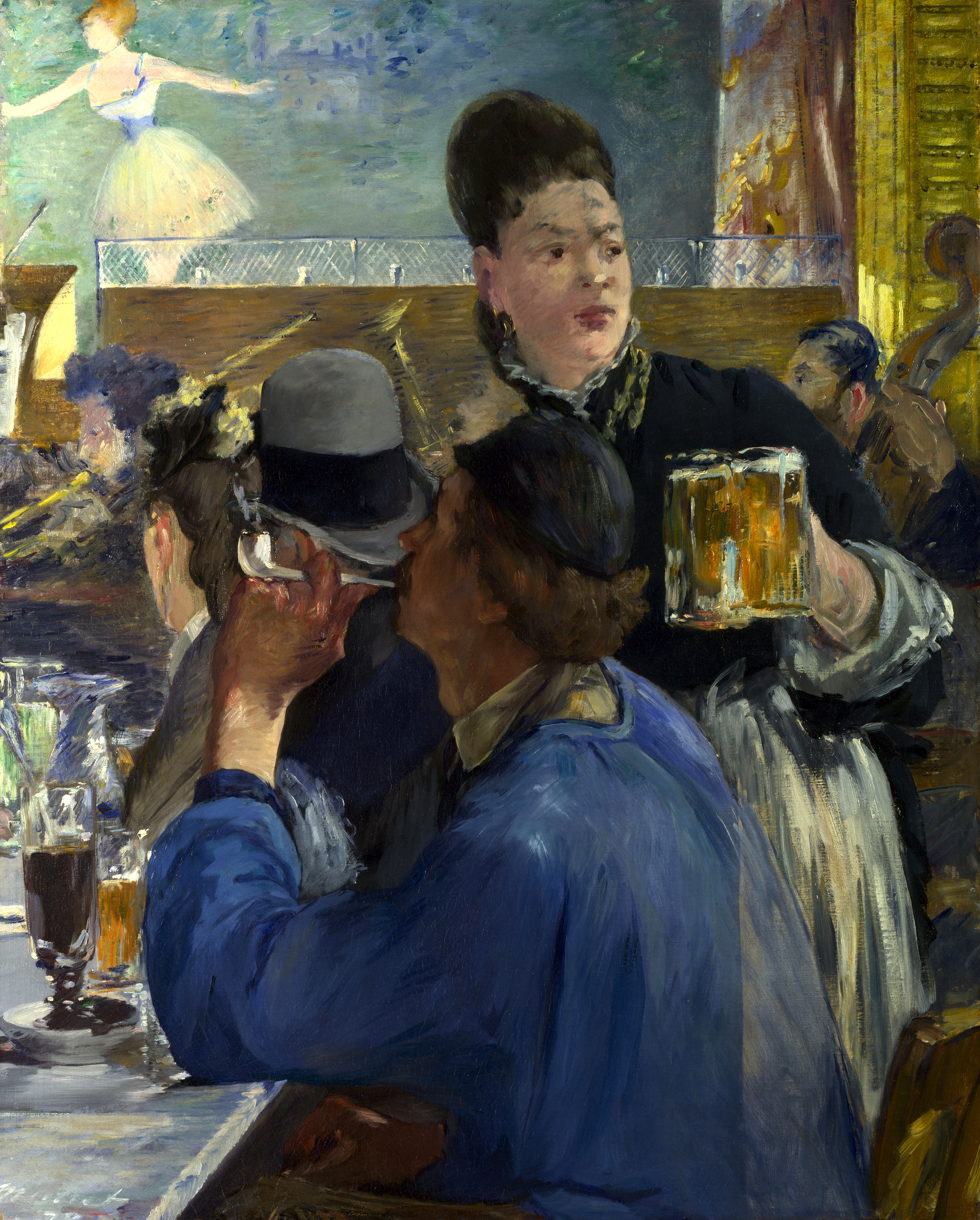
Corner of a Café-Concert, the right half of a painting of the Brasserie de Reichshoffen, Boulevard Marguerite-de-Rochechouart, Paris, by Édouard Manet circa 1879

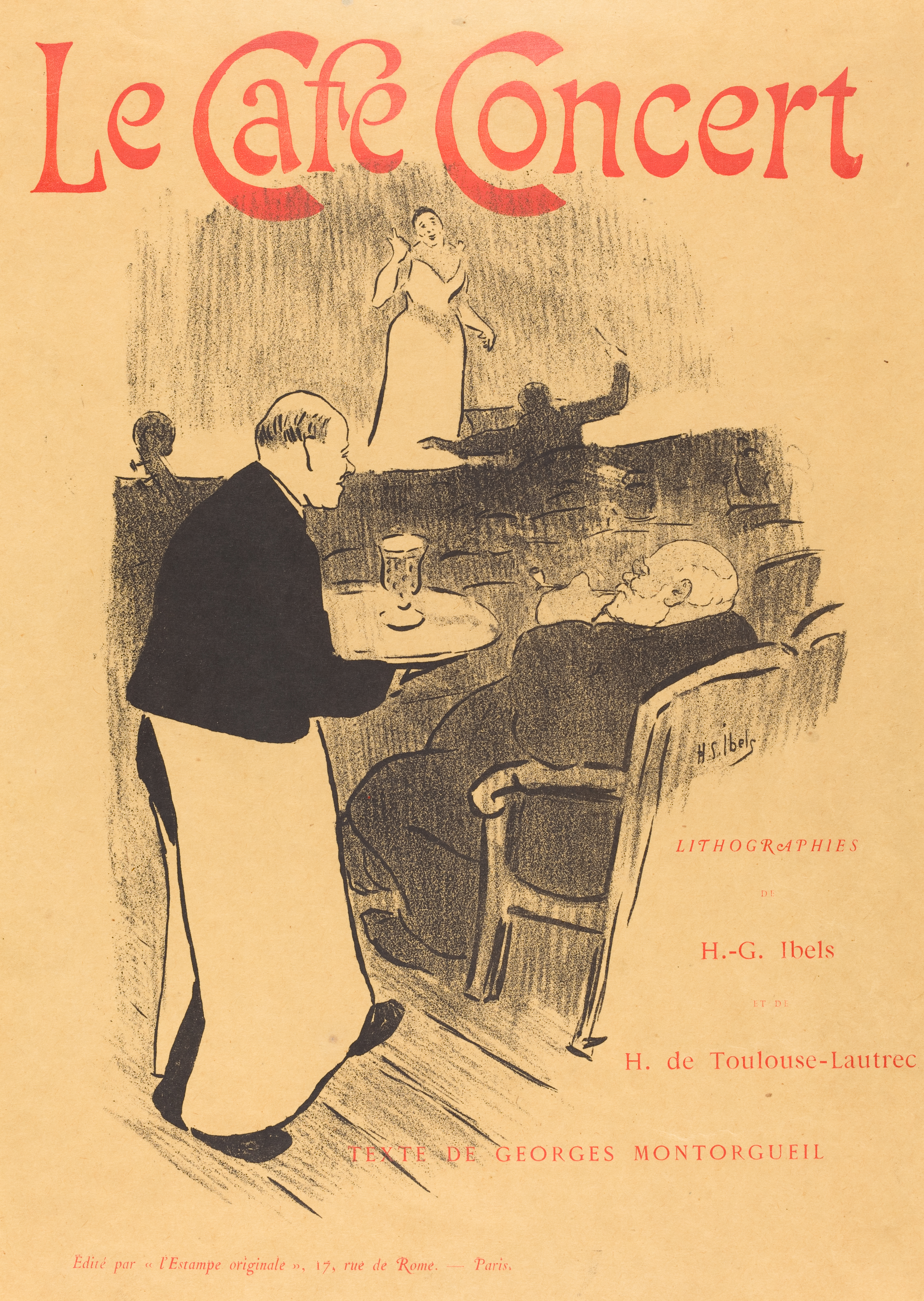
Le Café Concert by Henri-Gabriel Ibels, illustrated book cover by Ibels and Toulouse-Lautrec, 1893 — the customer is Francisque Sarcey

Café-chantant (French pronunciation: [kafe ʃɑ̃tɑ̃]; French: lit. 'singing café'), café-concert, or caf'conc is a type of musical establishment associated with the Belle Époque in France. The music was generally lighthearted and sometimes risqué or even bawdy—but, as opposed to the cabaret tradition, not particularly political or confrontational.

== Origins ==
Although there is much overlap of definition with cabaret, music hall, vaudeville, etc., the café-chantant was originally an outdoor café where small groups of performers performed popular music for the public.

The tradition of such establishments as a venue for music has its origins in the Paris and London of the eighteenth century.

Café Chantant establishments gained their widest popularity in the late nineteenth and early twentieth centuries with the growth of various other national "schools" of café-chantant (besides French). Thus, one spoke of an Italian café-chantant, German café-chantant, or Austrian café-chantant. For example, at least one Victorian-era premises in England was known as a café-chantant. One of the most famous performers in this medium was violinist Georges Boulanger, who performed in this style from 1910 until 1958, and singer Gorella Gori or Zaira Erba who died in 1963.

== National variations ==
Spain

In Spain, such an establishment was known as a café-concert (such as the Café de las Salesas in Madrid) or café cantante, and became the centre for professional flamenco performances from the mid-nineteenth century to the 1920s.

Turkey

Cafés chantants were known as كافشانتان (kafeşantan) in Turkish, and many were opened in the Beyoğlu/Péra district of Istanbul in the early years of the twentieth century. They are described in great detail in the memoirs of such authors as Ahmed Rasim and Sermet Muhtar Alus. Earlier versions of the kafeşantan, known as kahvehane in Turkish, appeared in Istanbul during the Ottoman Era as early as 1554. Hundreds of them were opened continually, most of them with a social club status.

Russia

In the Russian Empire, the term was taken wholesale into the Russian language as "kafe-shantan" (кафе-шантан). Odessa was the city best known for its numerous kafe-shantany.

== Twentieth century events ==
In the twentieth century, Cafe Chantant events were held across the UK by the women's suffrage movement to bring together their supporters and to raise funds. The organization of the events of musical and other performances held the movement were intended to be of a high standard (and unlikely to be risqué although unconventional), so that fundraising this way was successful

In 1900, a Thé and Café Chantant event was organised in Edinburgh by Alice Low and an actor to raise money for a patriotic fund for Scottish soldiers.

In 1908, this type of fundraising was led by Jessie M.Soga, contralto, A programme for a London Cafe Chantant shows the variety of performances ranging from music or talks, to clairvoyance and jujitsu. starting in one branch, then rolling out across Scotland.

In 1916, an event for prisoners of war comforts fund was organised by a 'tea committee' in Leamington Spa, during the First World War.

== Literary uses ==
Le Café Concert was a book published by L'Estampe originale in 1893 about the French establishments of that day. The book contains text by Georges Montorgueil, and is illustrated with numerous lithographs by Toulouse-Lautrec and Henri-Gabriel Ibels that mostly feature famous performers or customers from the contemporary Paris scene.

The name Café Chantant appears in

- Araby, a short story by James Joyce (written c. 1904–1905; published 1914 in Dubliners)
- The Man Who Was Thursday: A Nightmare, by G. K. Chesterton (published 1908)
- Buddenbrooks, by Thomas Mann (published 1901) in German
- The Sundays of Jean Dézert, by Jean de La Ville de Mirmont (published 1914)
- Crime and Punishment (Part Six, Chapter VI), by Fyodor Dostoevsky (published 1866) in Russian

== See also ==
- fr:Théâtre de variétés
- it:Varietà (spettacolo)
