= Paulus (singer) =

French music hall singer and entertainer (1845–1908)

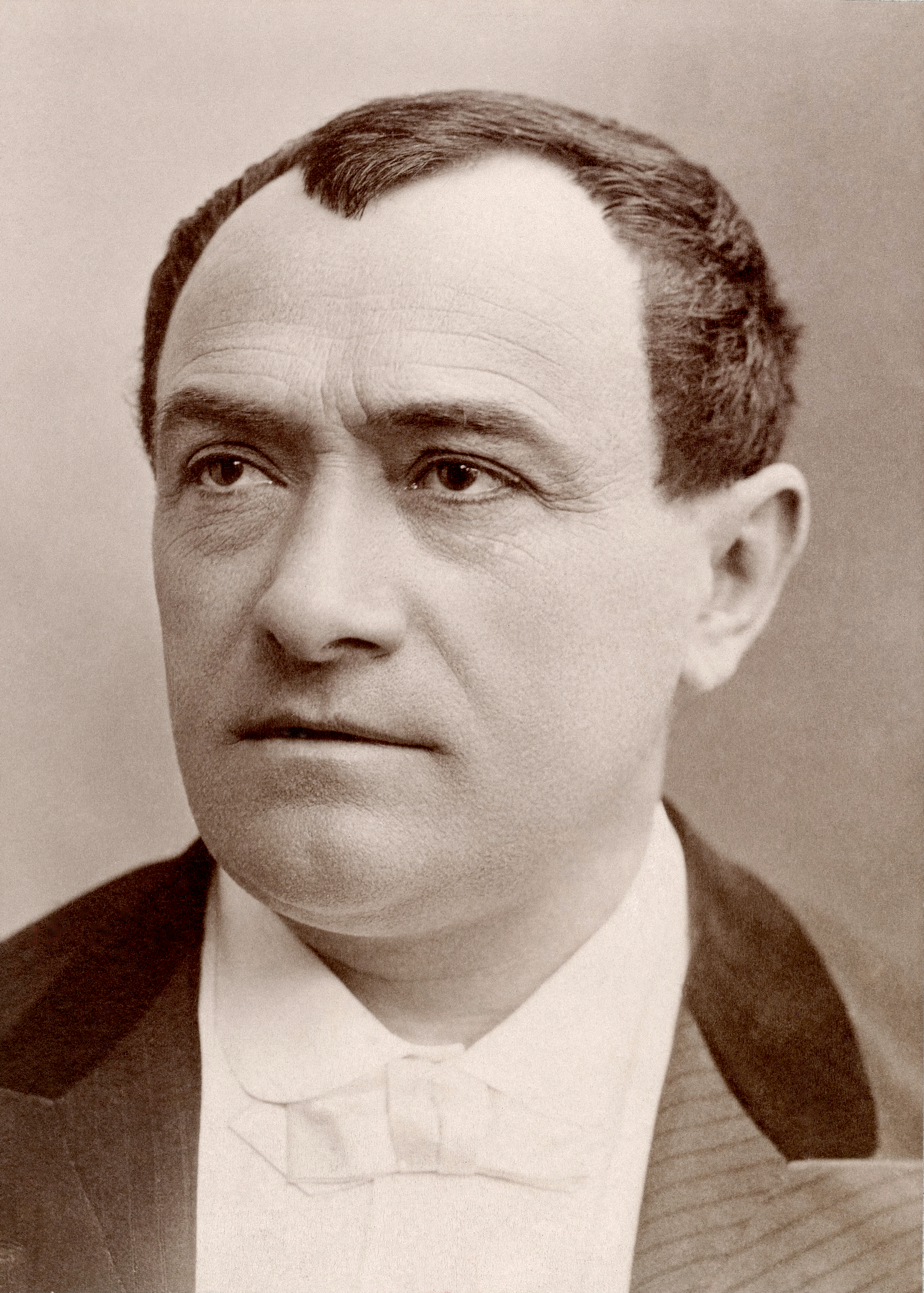
- Paulus, photographed by Nadar

Background information
- Also known as: Paulus
- Born: Jean-Paulin Habans; 6 February 1845; Saint-Esprit (Bayonne), Landes, France
- Died: 1 June 1908 (aged 63) Saint-Mandé, Seine, France
- Occupations: Singer and entertainer

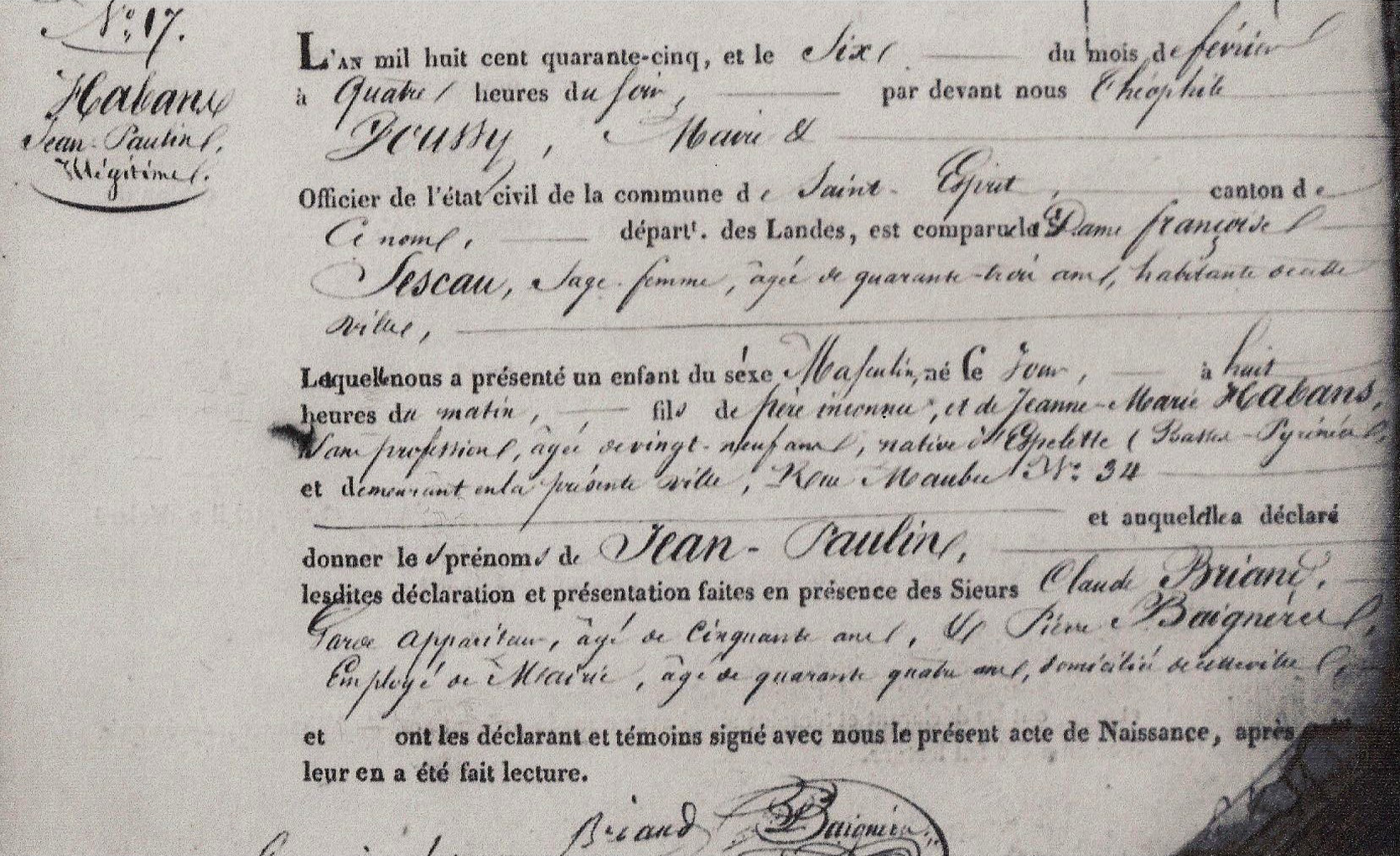
Paulus' birth certificate

Jean-Paulin Habans, known as Paulus (6 February 1845 - 1 June 1908), was a French singer, entertainer and theatre entrepreneur of the Belle Époque. Paulus created a complete transformation in popular singing style and in doing so he became the most popular male singer in Paris in the 1870s and 1880s. His career clearly marked a turning point in the history of French chanson: the start of the era of stardom.

== Early life and career ==
Jean-Paulin Habans was born in Saint-Esprit, a suburb of Bayonne. While he maintained all his life that he was born into a family of small shopkeepers, in reality and according to his birth certificate his father was unknown and Habans the name of his mother, born Jeanne-Marie Habans, with no profession. He grew up in Bordeaux. After a brief education and some odd jobs as employee of a lottery agency and as clerk in a bailiff's office, he embarked upon a singing career while frequenting the goguettes. He made his debut in the café-concert in Paris in 1864. Little by little, he was programmed in the most prestigious French theatres, notably the Eldorado (1872–1878) and the Alcazar d'Été. With Thérésa and Éloi Ouvrard, he was one of the first real vedettes of the caf'conc'.

Around 1871, Paulus introduced a "new thrill" to the caf'conc'; a new singing style with continual frenetic movement, grimaces, and gesticulation. The new genre was typified by "a frantic, disjointed movement that was seen as [...] epileptic and puppet-like" that the theatre critic Francisque Sarcey termed gambillard in relation to the mimicking of the gesticulations and dislocations of puppets, in which the performer mainly used his legs while hopping, striding, jumping. As chanteur agité (agitated singer), Paulus created a complete transformation in popular singing style – "there had to be movement, always more movement" – and in doing so he became the most popular male singer in Paris in the 1870s and 1880s.

In his memoirs, Trente ans de Café-concert, Paulus said he was inspired by a group of male comic dancers, Les Clodoches – very much in fashion in the late 1860s – and by Thomas Holden's marionettes. He had seen the Clodoches at the Alcazar and Eldorado in Paris and when, in 1869, engaged at the Jardin Oriental in Toulouse, he performed an old favourite song Les Pompiers de Nanterre, mimicking one of the Clodoches (Flageollet). Whirling about wildly, he was accompanied by a chorus replicating the Clodoches' frenzied dance act. Around 1880 Paulus had fine-tuned the gambillard act, and by 1886 his popularity would reach its peak.

== Stardom ==
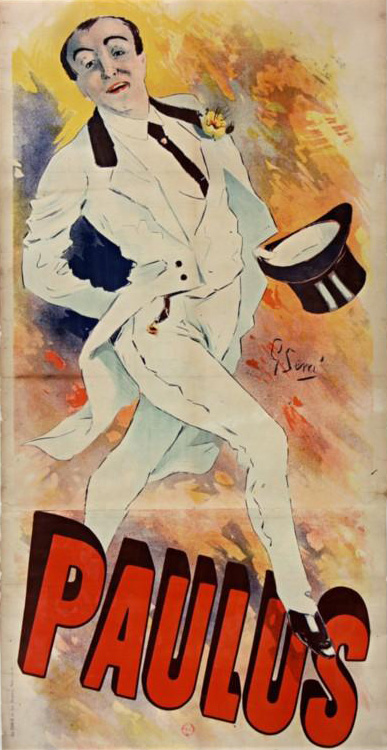
Poster by Sem (1891)

In 1883, Paulus signed a lucrative for three years at the Concert Parisien, demanding an astronomical fee (he was the first to do so), but he sang regularly at other venues, sometimes going so far as to sing, for different audiences (including private performances), up to 40 songs in a single evening, making up to FF 1,500 (equivalent to €6,300 in 2025) per day. He suddenly became rich and famous, and bought a mansion in Neuilly, hiring servants, and a driver. In 1885, he left Concert Parisien and following a lawsuit (which he lost - the breach of his contract cost him FF 30,000 (equivalent to €130,000 in 2025), he found himself at the La Scala and the Alcazar d'Été.

Paulus achieved more fame with a stroke of genius. On France's national day, 14 July 1886, he took advantage of the popularity of the revanchist and populist politician General Boulanger to mention him in a reworked verse of En revenant de la revue (Returning from the revue) that had opened that year at the Alcazar d'Été. The title referred not a theatrical performance, but to a military review, and became the anthem of the Boulangist movement that many feared could have taken over power through a coup d'état. Paulus might have been one of the first variety stars to mix in politics and was one of the many fervent supporters of General Boulanger at the time. However, "I have never been involved in politics, but I have always watched the news", he later commented in his memoires.

In 1887, he founded the journal La Revue des Concerts, together with the songwriters and composers Lucien Delormel and Léon Garnier, where he gave free rein to his vindictive character causing it to close in less than two years. He purchased a theatre in Paris, the Ba-Ta-Clan, in 1892, and the Alhambra in Marseille. Closed due to bankruptcy, the Ba-Ta-Clan became a fashionable venue again under Paulus' management. He entrusted the artistic direction to his favourite lyricist, Léon Garnier. Fragson, Aristide Bruant, Paula Brébion could be seen and heard there, and one of the attractions was provided by Buffalo Bill. The adventure lasted until 1897.

In 1888, he was the first to achieve very high fees (FF 400 per performance, equivalent to €1,900 in 2025). According to historians, Paulus clearly marks a turning point in the history of French chanson: the era of stardom had begun. At the 1889 Paris Expo, Paulus was recorded on Edison's phonograph by Adelbert Theodor Wangemann, the world's first professional recording engineer. From 1889 onwards, he toured the European capitals, Russia and New York.

== Decline and death ==
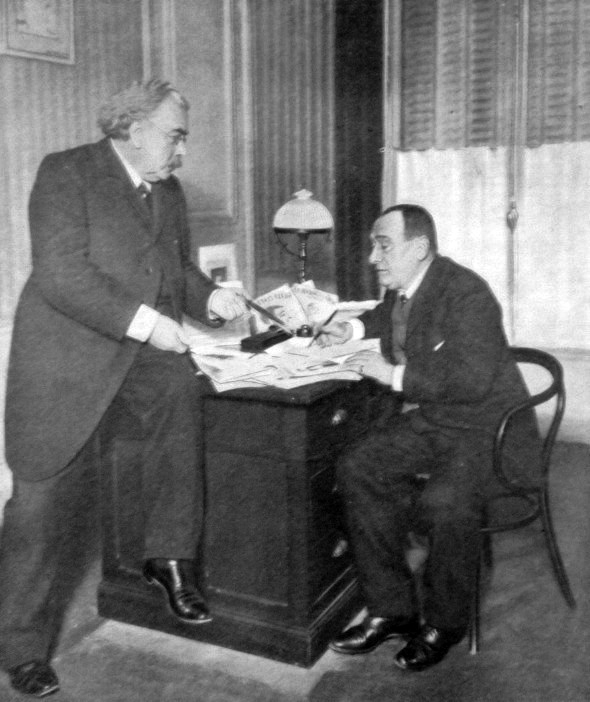
Paulus (right) and Octave Pradels (left) working on Paulus' memoirs, on the cover of La vie illustrée, 30 November 1906

From 1894 onwards, the star began to fade: the means were still there but he was struggling with enormous financial and family difficulties. A divorce and ill-fated financial speculations, among others in a vineyard (named Clos Paulus) near Bordeaux, eventually exhausted his financial resources. In 1900, he had his last great success when he replaced the ailing Yvette Guilbert at the Café des Ambassadeurs. Ruined, he had to continue his career until 1903 when, exhausted, he had to stop. He was then 58 years old.

In 1897, the pioneering cinematographer Georges Méliès was commissioned by Paulus to make films of his performances. Because Paulus refused to perform outdoors, some thirty arc and mercury lamps had to be used in Méliès provisional studio near the Paris Opera, one of the first times artificial light was used for cinematography. Paulus sang five of his songs, including Derriere l'omnibus and Coquin de Printemps, which were subsequently projected as Paulus Chantant at the Ba-Ta-Clan. There, Paulus sat behind the cinema screen and sang the songs – thus giving the illusion of cinema with sound – only appearing on stage to sing the last verse. By this time Paulus was aged and tired, and it is suggested that the films would spare him performing live; or that he tried to win back audiences by combining film and live stage performance.

On 19 December 1906, a gala evening was organised for him by the daily newspaper Le Figaro at the Théâtre de la Gaîté, in which the greatest artists took part. A year and a few months later, on the first of June 1908, aged 63, he died of arteriosclerosis and was buried in the Cimetière Sud de Saint-Mandé, which is part of the commune but located in the 12th arrondissement of Paris.

Just before his death, with the help of the songwriter Octave Pradels, he had collected his memories. They were published in the form of 33 illustrated booklets, accompanied by reproductions of the characters mentioned, and scores. These memories are full of anecdotes about the café-concert, its contemporaries and some legendary figures: Thérésa, Gustave Nadaud, Eugénie Fougère, Céleste Mogador, Virginie Déjazet, Marius Richard, Polin, Harry Fragson, Yvette Guilbert, Félix Mayol, Aristide Bruant, Dranem and the soprano Hortense Schneider.

According to the magazine Les Chansons de Paris in 1903, Paulus created 2,500 songs during his 30 years of success.

== Sources ==
- Abel, Richard (ed.) (2005). Encyclopedia of Early Cinema, London/New York: Routledge ISBN 0-415-23440-9
- Brigstocke, Julian (2016). The Life of the City: Space, Humour, and the Experience of Truth in Fin-de-siècle Montmartre, London: Routledge ISBN 978-1-4094-4896-9
- (in French) Brunschwig, Chantal; Calvet, Louis-Jean & Klein, Jean-Claude (1981). Cent ans de chanson française, Paris: Seuil ISBN 2-02-00-2915-4
- (in French) Caradec, François & Alain Weill (1980). Le café-concert, Paris: Hachette/Massin ISBN 2-01-006940-4
- Chaitin, Gilbert D. (ed.) (2008). Culture Wars and Literature in the French Third Republic, Newcastle: Cambridge Scholars Publishing, ISBN 1-84718-808-7
- Gordon, Rae Beth (2001). Why the French Love Jerry Lewis: From Cabaret to Early Cinema, Stanford (CA): Stanford University Press, ISBN 978-0-8047-3894-1
- Gordon, Rae Beth (2009). Dances With Darwin, 1875-1910: Vernacular Modernity in France, Farnham: Ashgate Publishing, ISBN 978-0-7546-5243-4
- Leslie, Peter (1978). A Hard Act to Follow: A Music Hall Review, New York: Paddington Press ISBN 0-7092-0466-3
- (in French) Pradels, Octave (1907). Paulus: Trente ans de Café-concert, Paris: Societe d'edition et de publications
- Senelick, Laurence (2020). Ballroom Frenzy and the Clodoche Quadrille, New Theatre Quarterly, Volume 36, Issue 3, August 2020, pp. 197–213. doi:10.1017/S0266464X20000482
- Zeldin, Theodore (1993). A History of French Passions 1848-1945: Intellect, taste and anxiety, Oxford: Clarendon Press/Oxford University Press ISBN 0-19-822178-9
