= Alfred Choubrac =

French costume designer and poster artist

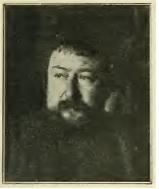
- Alfred Choubrac c. 1896
- Born: 30 December 1853; La Chapelle (Seine), France
- Died: 25 July 1902 (aged 48); Paris, France
- Occupations: Painter, illustrator, draughtsman, costume designer and poster artist

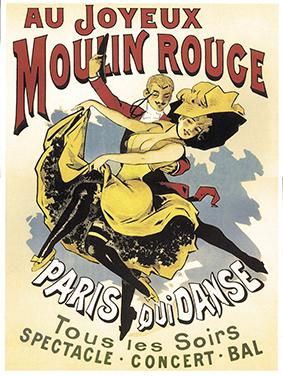
Advertising poster of the Moulin Rouge by Alfred Choubrac, 1896

Alfred Choubrac (30 December 1853 – 25 July 1902) was a French painter, illustrator, draughtsman, poster artist and costume designer. Together with Jules Chéret he is considered to be one of the pioneers of the modern coloured and illustrated poster of the Belle Époque in France, in particular in Paris.

== Early life ==
Alfred Choubrac was born in Montmartre, Paris. With his elder brother Léon Choubrac (1847–1885), Alfred was trained as a classical artist at the École des Beaux Arts by the painters Charles Doërr (fr) and Isidore Pils. The Choubrac brothers began making posters very early in their career; from 1875, they applied modern colour and typographic techniques, combined with graphics, using chromolithography.

In the early 1870s, the Choubrac brothers and Jules Chéret (known as "the father of the modern poster") reduced the cost of colour lithography introducing technical advances and the colour poster gained significance as an attractive means of promotion and advertisements. Additionally, in 1881 restrictions on bill-posting (affichage) were lifted and eased state control of the media in France. In 1884, the Paris city council started to rent out space belonging to the municipality, paving the way for a rapid increase in the production and distribution of advertising posters. Posters with clear colours and dashing images appeared all over town during the vibrant spirit of the Belle Époque.

== Ateliers Choubrac ==
The Choubracs worked mainly with the printing company F. Appel. Later, Léon and Alfred created the Ateliers Choubrac, one of the first graphic design agencies in Paris, originally hosted by the printing press G. Massias at the 17 passage Daudin (15th arrondissement of Paris), using a lithographic press. Around 1898, the name of the Atelier was associated with the name of Imprimerie Bourgerie & Cie, at 83 rue du Faubourg, St Denis in Paris. Although his brother Leon died young, Alfred went on to produce an impressive number of posters for Parisian entertainers, theatres, businesses and various commercial products.

Alfred Choubrac specialized in posters for shows in the Parisian night-life scene of the Belle Époque, for theatres such as the Théâtre des Variétés, Théâtre du Châtelet, Folies Bergère, Opéra comique, Moulin Rouge, Casino de Paris, the Eldorado, the Circus Fernando. Along with Chéret and Toulouse-Lautrec, amongst others, Choubrac was among the most important poster artist of his time. His most famous poster is Au Joyeux Moulin Rouge to promote the famous nightclub.

To reduce costs, the same design could be used for several theatres. (See below: Poster of Eugénie Fougére for the Café des Ambassadeurs and the Alcazar d'Été)

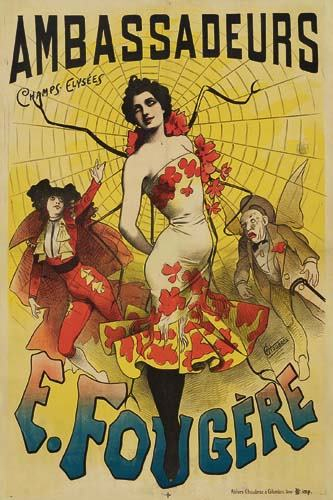

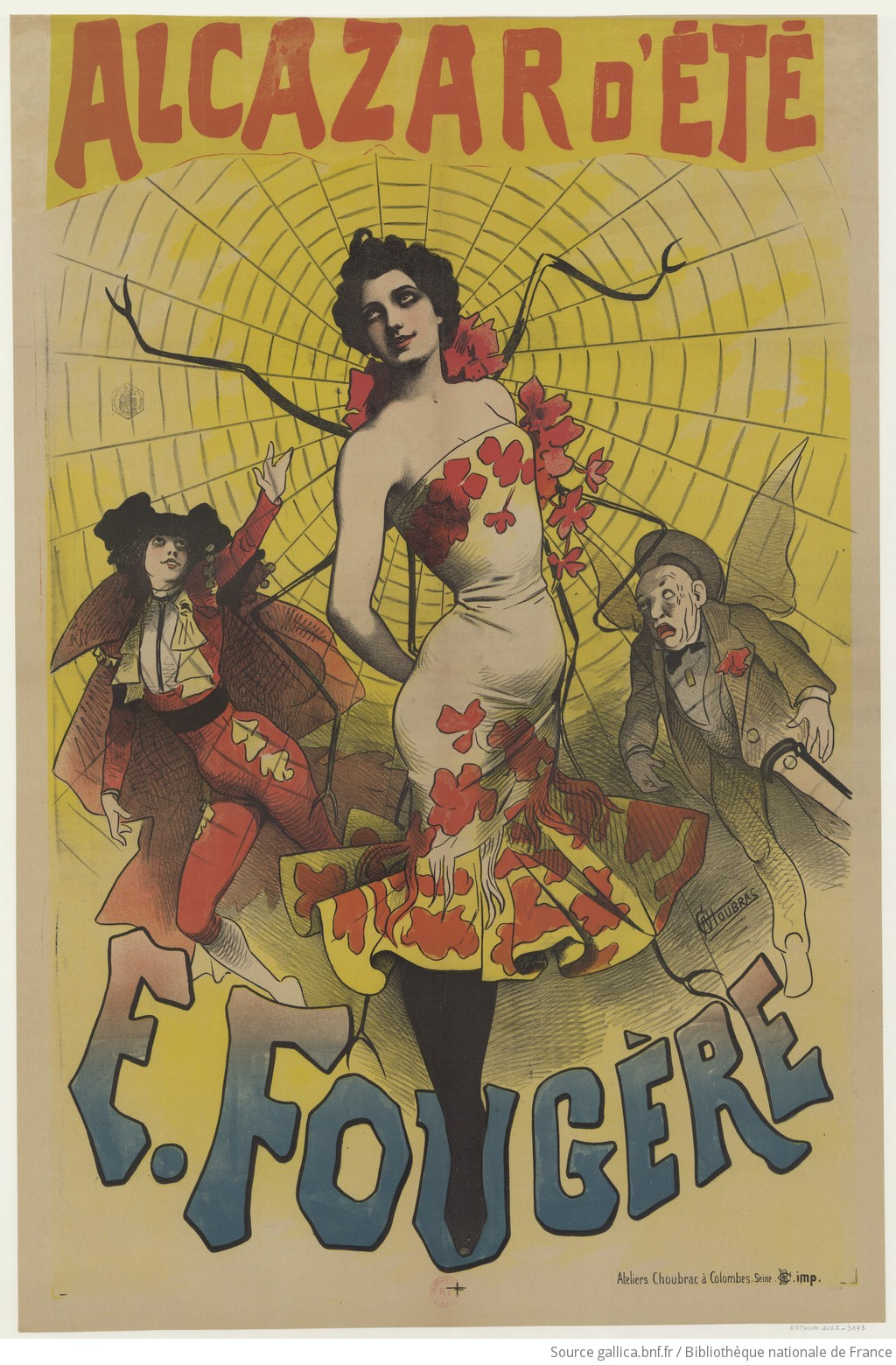

== Censored ==
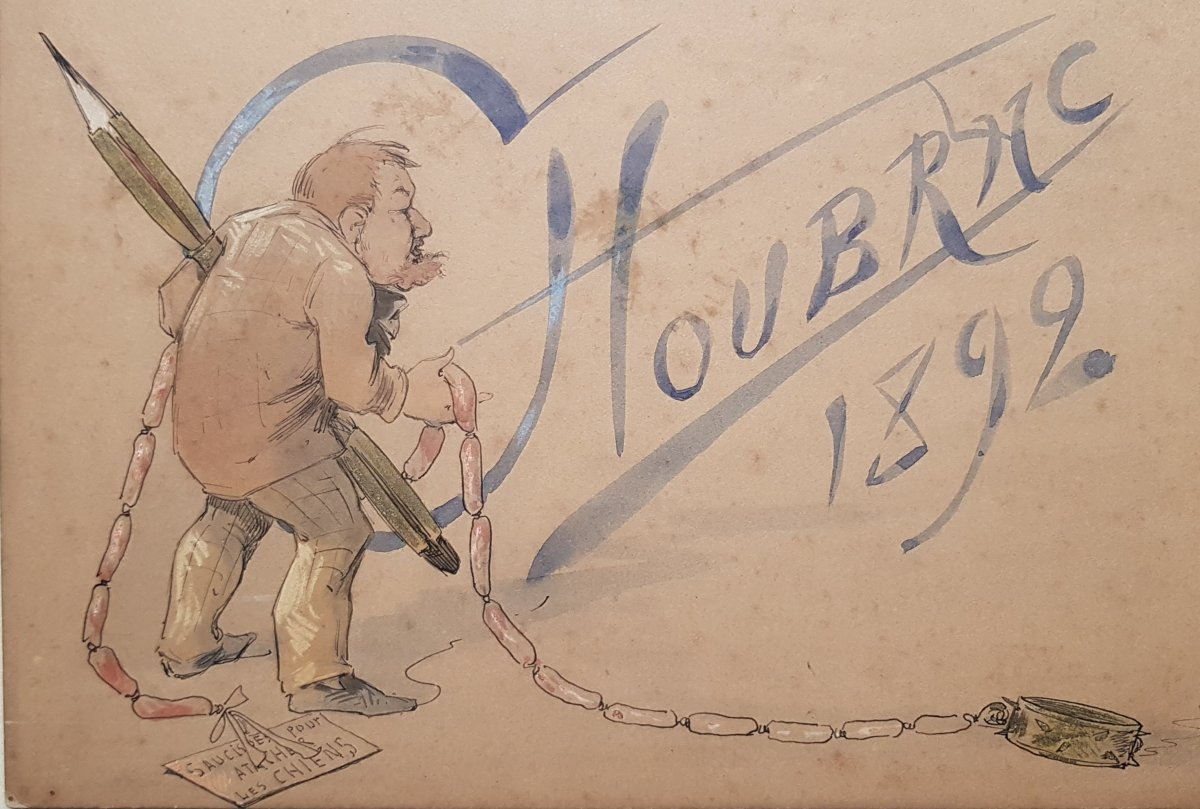
Satirical self portrait of Alfred Choubrac (1892). The text box says: Saucisses pour attacher les chiens (Sausages for tying up dogs)

The 1880s and 1890s were an intermediary period in the development of the poster in which its primary political function shifted to a primarily promotional one as advertising in the emerging consumer economy. The poster began a new phase of its development, promoting merchandise, often through representations of female sexuality. The frequent presence of female sexuality was seen by conservative circles and the authorities as a challenge and a threat to public morals.

In April 1891, under orders from the Minister of the Interior, the prefect of Paris, Henri-Auguste Lozé, seized and destroyed hundreds of posters considered to be a violation of public decency. Many artists and their printers were charged. Several of Choubrac's posters were prohibited and he was brought to court along with the printers.

One of the censored posters advertised the performance of the dancer Ilka de Mynn at the Folies Bergère, who was depicted in a maillot (body stocking), which, according to the court that charged Choubrac was a cause for concern because the model appeared to be nude. Another poster was an advertisement for the French magazine Fin de Siècle (fr), which showed a scarcely dressed female dancer. In an interview with La Presse, Choubrac said he was astonished by the upheaval, claiming that "nudity is exposed everywhere and in much more provocative ways; and I frankly confess that I do not see where the evil was, I sought to make a work of art and nothing more."

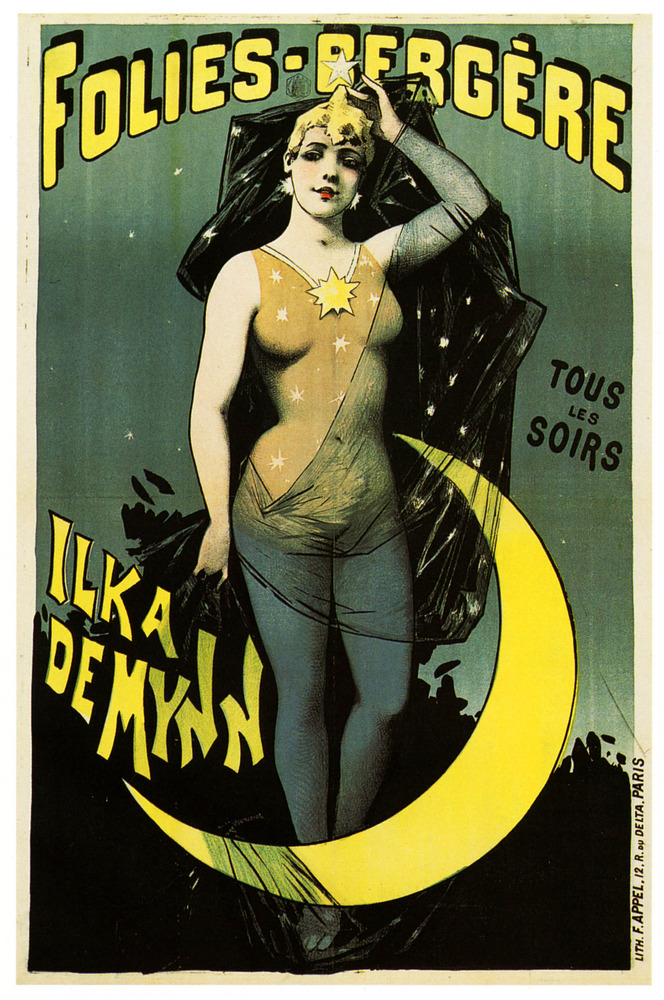
Ilka de Mynn at the Folies-Bergère, 1891

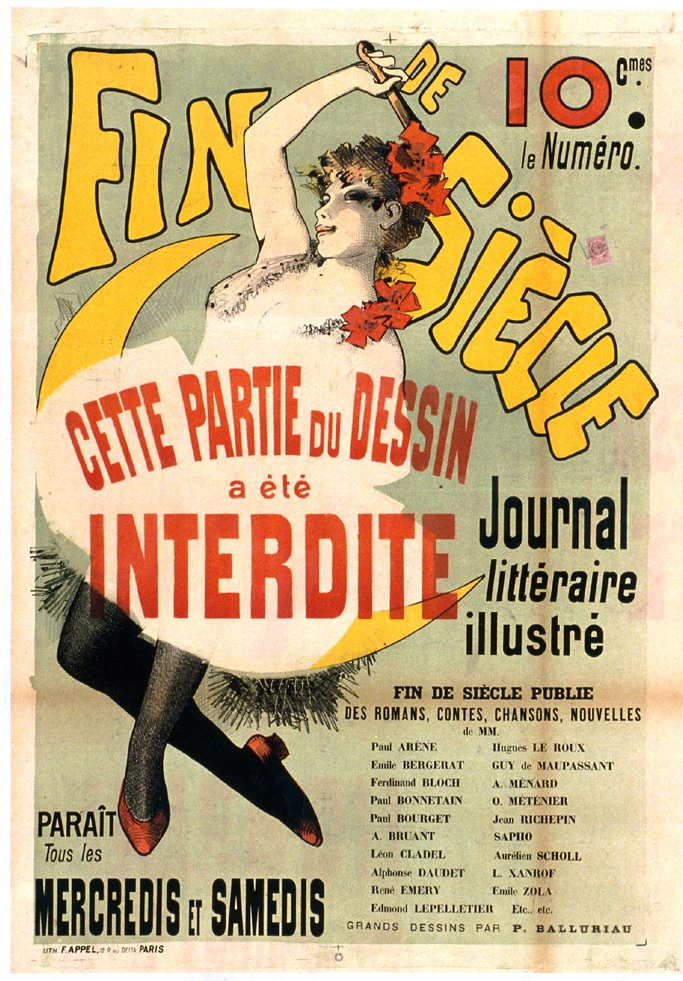
Censored poster for the French magazine Fin de Siècle, 1891

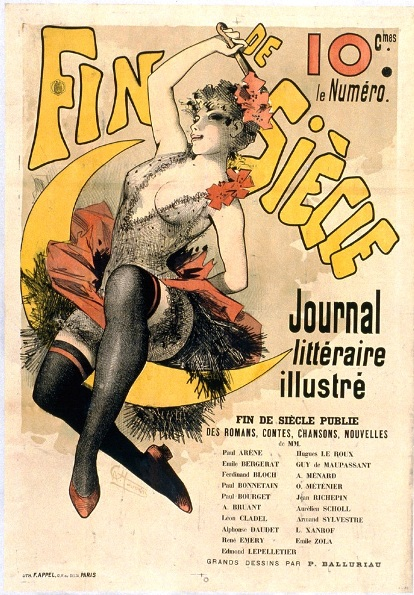
Uncensored poster for the French magazine Fin de Siècle, 1891

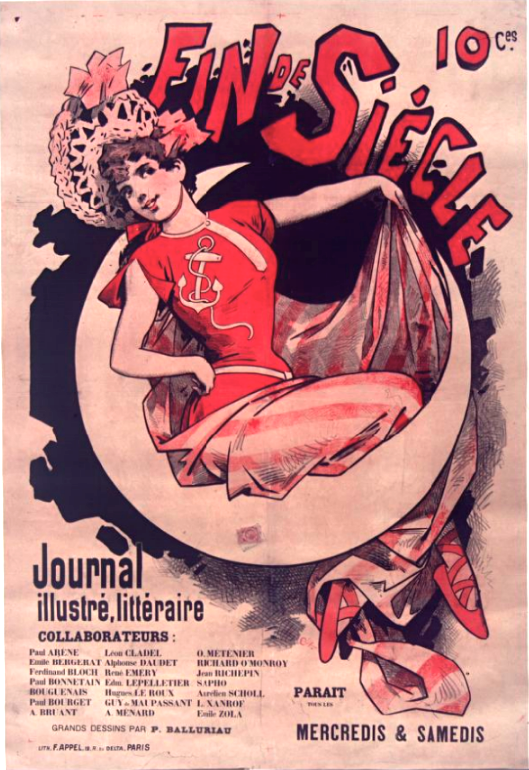
Second version for Fin de Siècle (after censored poster), 1891

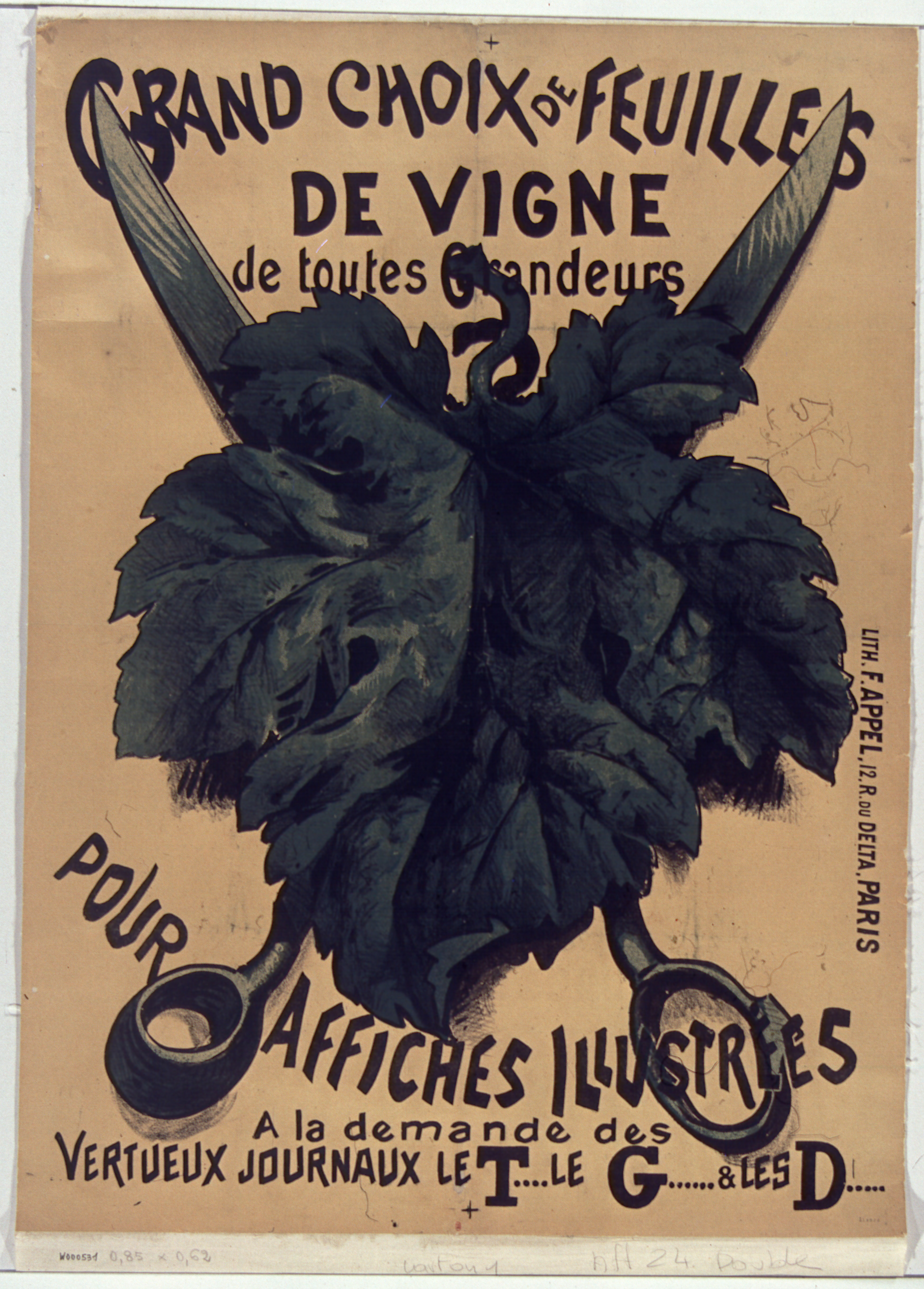
Poster in protest by Alfred Choubrac, 1891

Choubrac, the printers, and the proprietors of the magazine agreed to re-print the issue, leaving the censored areas as blank paper. 'This portion of the drawing has been prohibited', said the overprinted magazine cover. In reaction, Choubrac published a poster in protest, with a large vine leaf (to cover indecent images) and a long pair of scissors printed in green on yellow paper. The text of this leaflet, available in only a few copies, is as follows: "Large choice of vine leaves of all sizes for illustrated posters, at the request of the virtuous newspapers the T..., the G... and the D."

== Other work and exhibitions ==
In later life he became also known for his designs of stage costumes for the theatre. Choubrac illustrated several books of the novelist Emile Zola. He produced a number of posters for bookstores to promote popular works. He also produced commercial posters for brands such as the Muscovite digestive, Humber cycles, Beeston Tyres, Naigeon Gold Water, Unbreakable Baleinine corsets, Mokatine, Decauville cycles, Burgeatine liqueur (fr), and the Hippodrome of Saint-Ponchon, among others.

As an illustrator, he sometimes collaborated with his brother Léon in Gil Blas or the satirical weekly Le Courrier français, among others. The first poster exhibition in France occurred in 1884 in the Passage Vivienne in Paris and included American as well as French posters with specific representation of the work of Chéret and the two Choubrac brothers, the only three French designers deemed worthy to include. The New York Grolier Club in November 1890 organised an exhibition of prints of the "masters in the newest art", that of bill posting, including Choubrac, Chéret, Willette and Eugène Grasset.

== Legacy and death ==
The poster collector Ernest Maindron (fr), who wrote the first essay about the illustrated poster in the Gazette des Beaux-Arts in 1884, and later published the first book on the subject (Les Affiches Illustrees) in 1886, mentioned the Choubrac brothers and Chéret among the pioneers of the illustrated poster. Maindron praised Choubrac's bold line, sense of composition and highly decorative skills. According to Maindron, in his subsequent book Les Affiches Illustrees (1886–1895) published in 1896, Choubrac must have drawn more than four hundred posters for theatres, novels and industry products, before he switched his attention to the design of theatrical costumes, in which he was equally successful.

Alfred Choubrac died on 25 July 1902 from a cold gone bad.

== Selected works ==
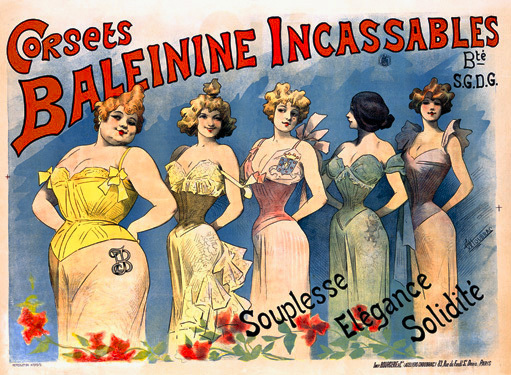
Advertising poster of Corsets Baleinine Incassables

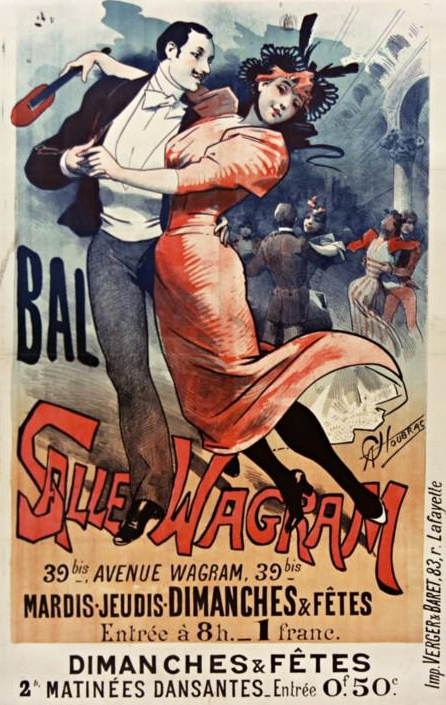
Advertising poster Salle Wagram, 1890

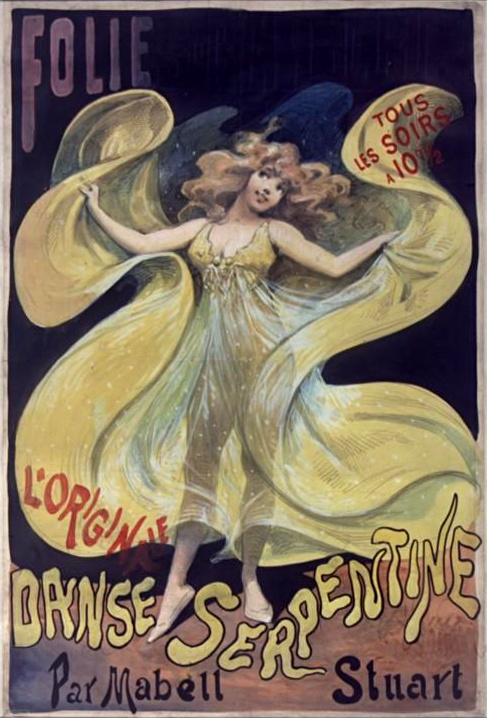
Poster Folies Bergère Danse de la serpentine, 1890

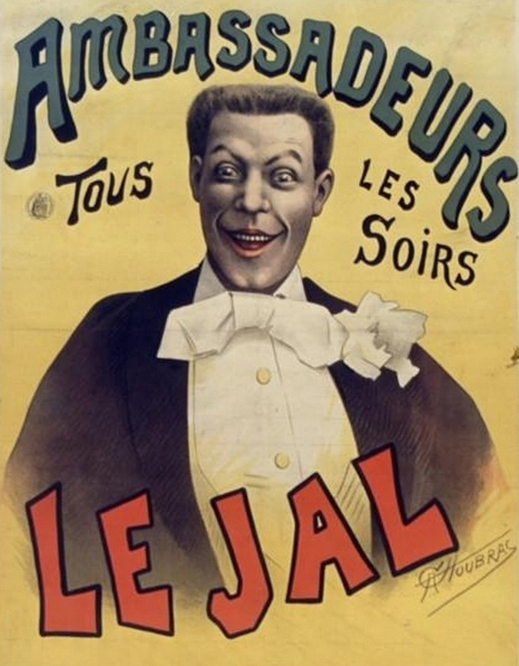
Advertising poster of the French chansonnier Victor Lejal in the Ambassadeurs, 1890

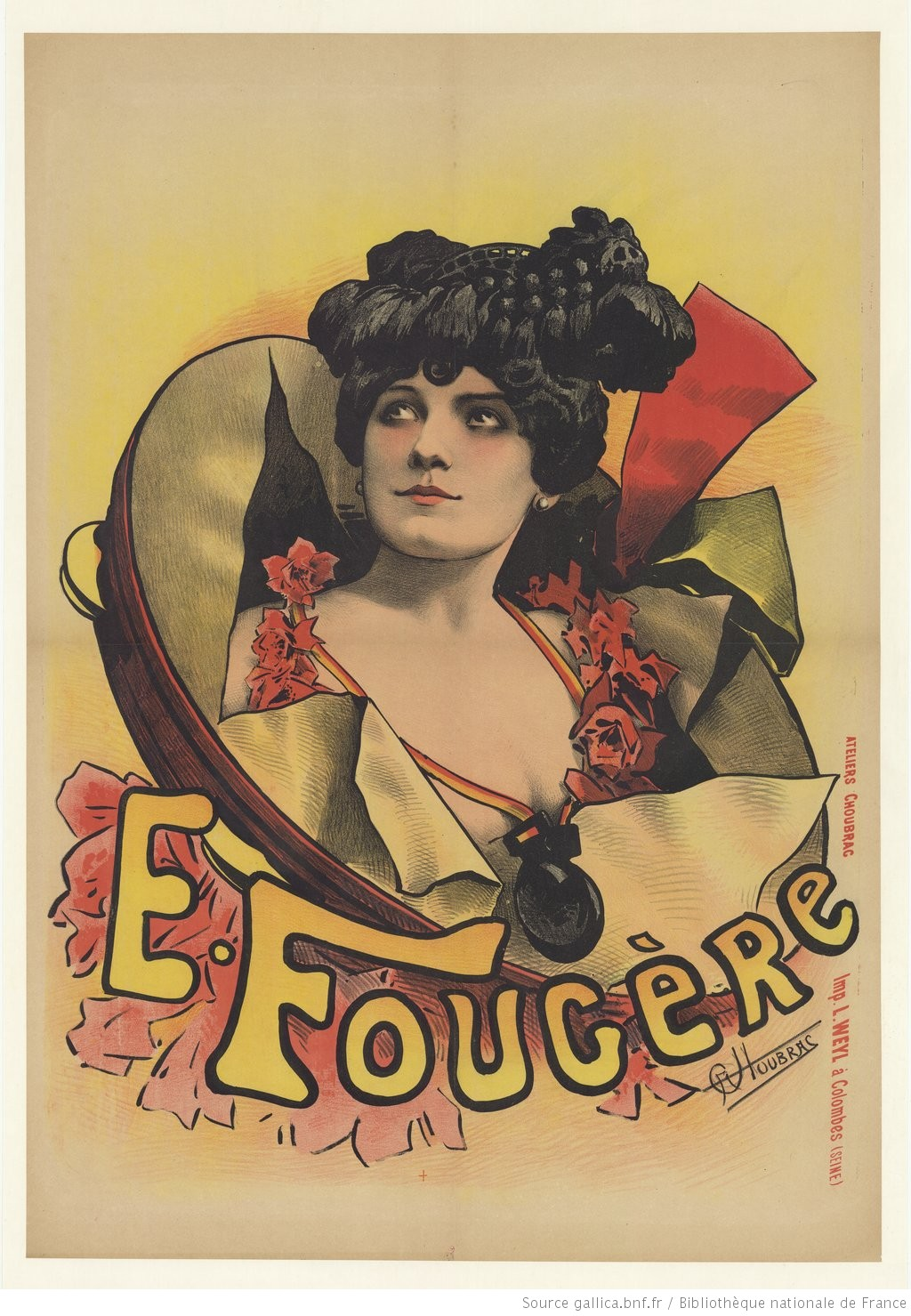
Portrait of Eugénie Fougère, ca. 1890

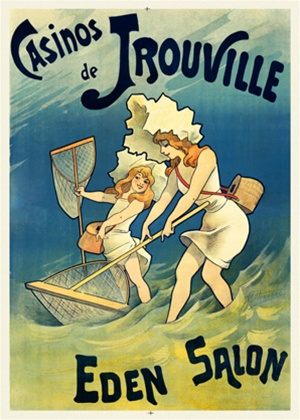
Poster Casinos de Trouville, 1890s

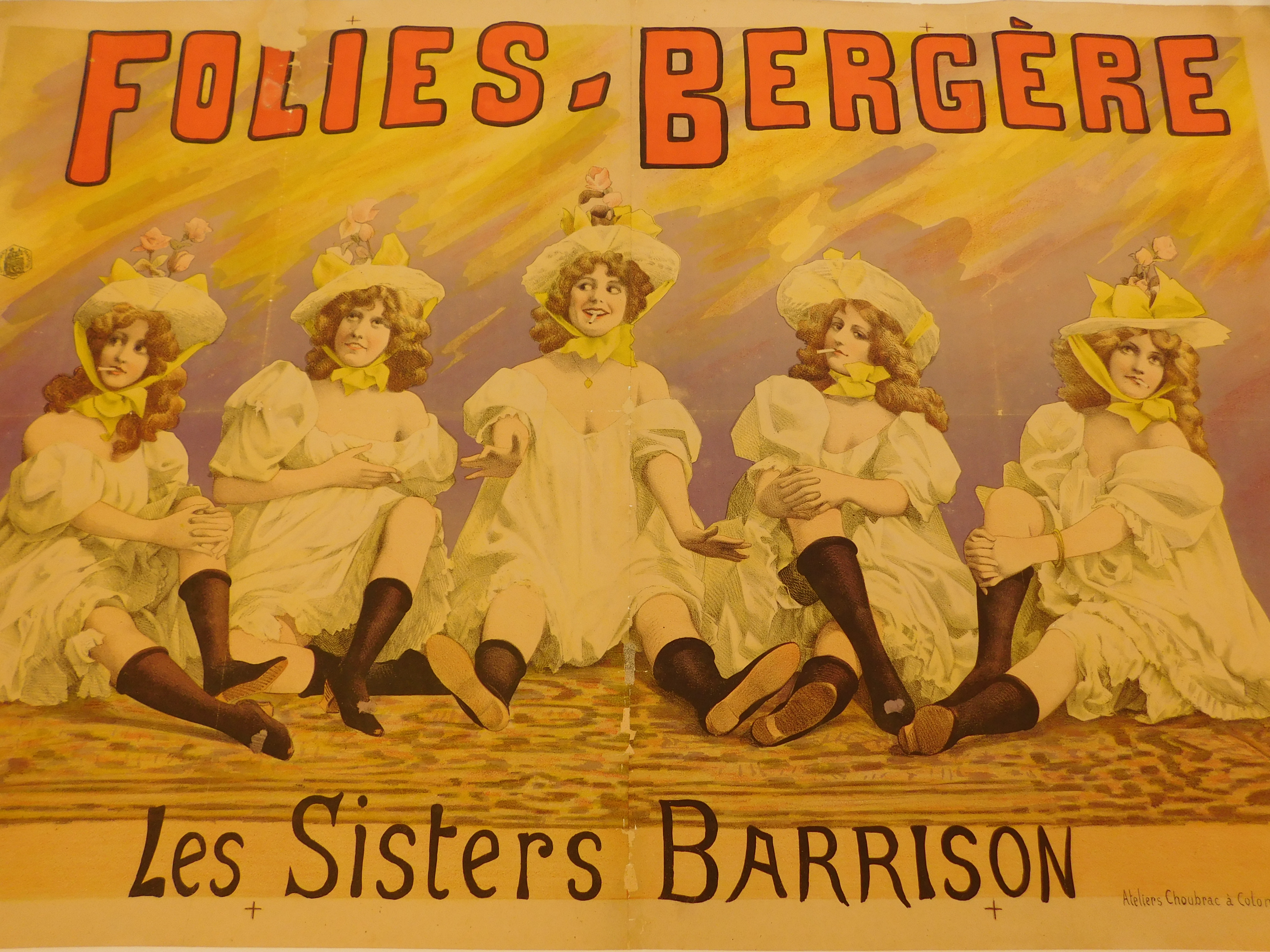
Poster Les Sisters Barrison at the Folies Bergère, c. 1895

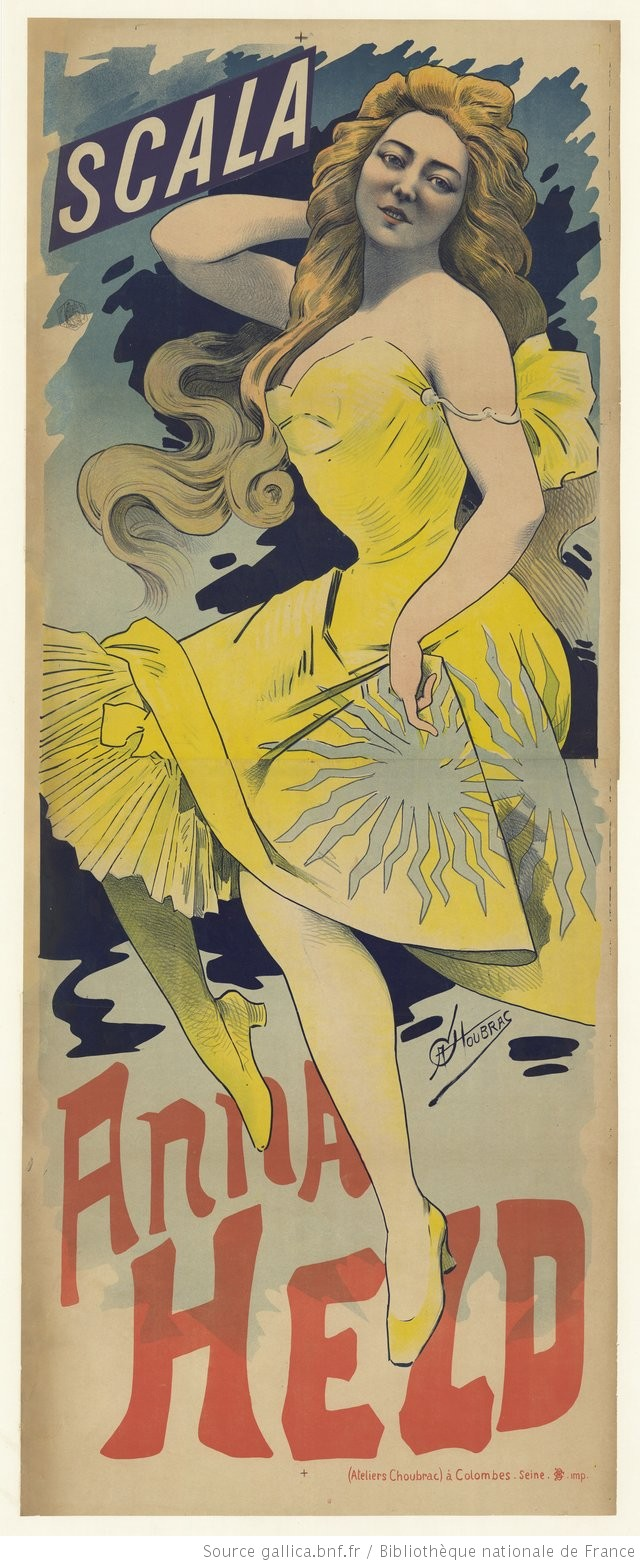
Poster of stage performer and singer Anna Held at the Scala (Paris), c. 1890

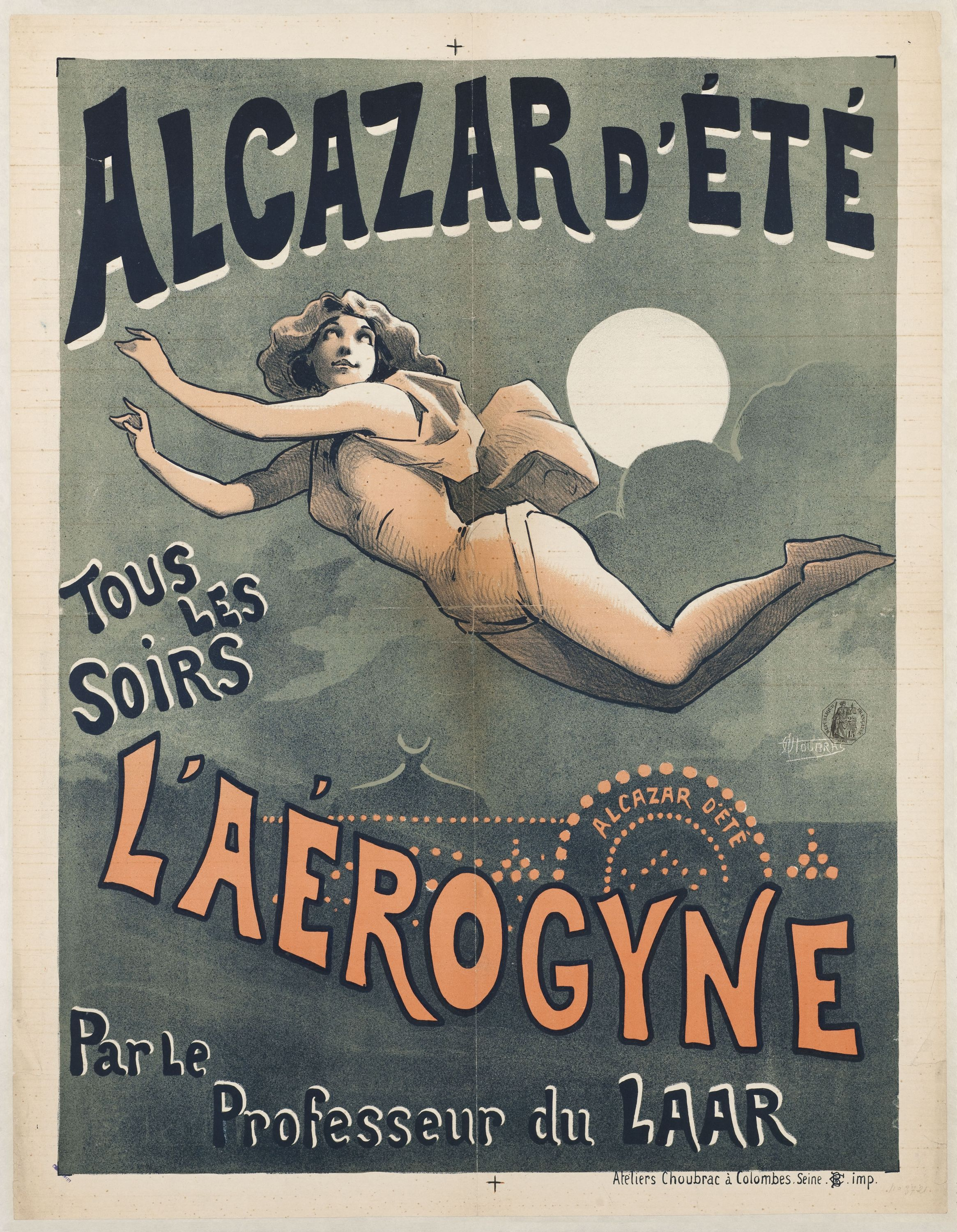
Poster L'aérogyne at the "Alcazar d'Été"

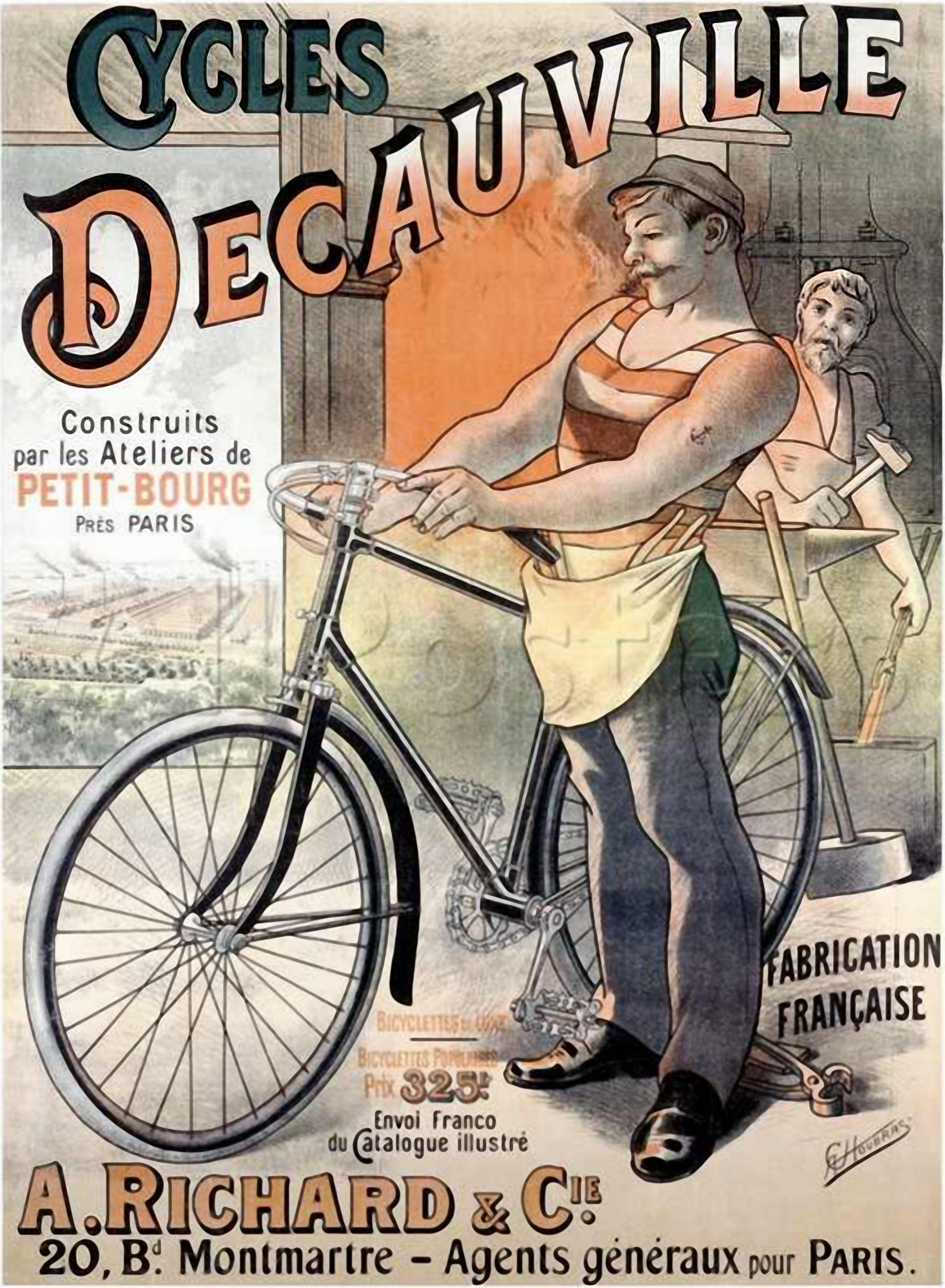
Advertising poster of Decauville cycles, c. 1892

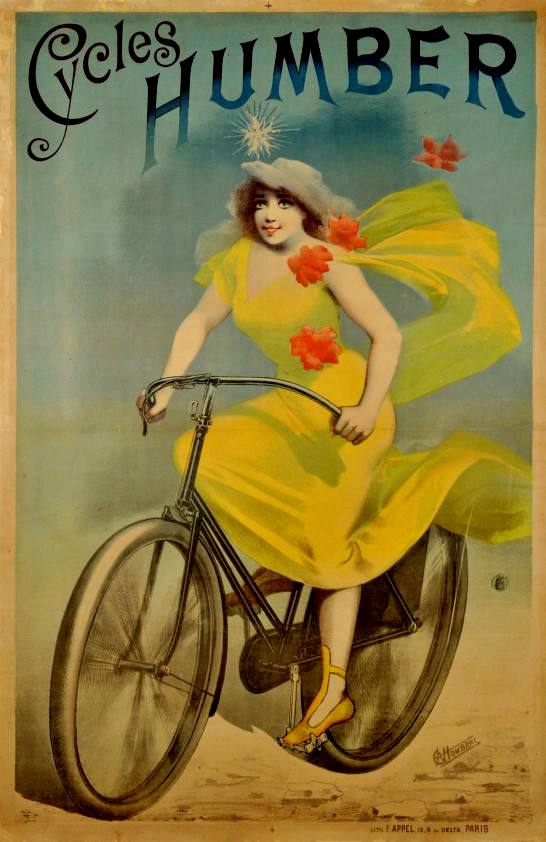
Advertising poster of Humber cycles, France, 1895

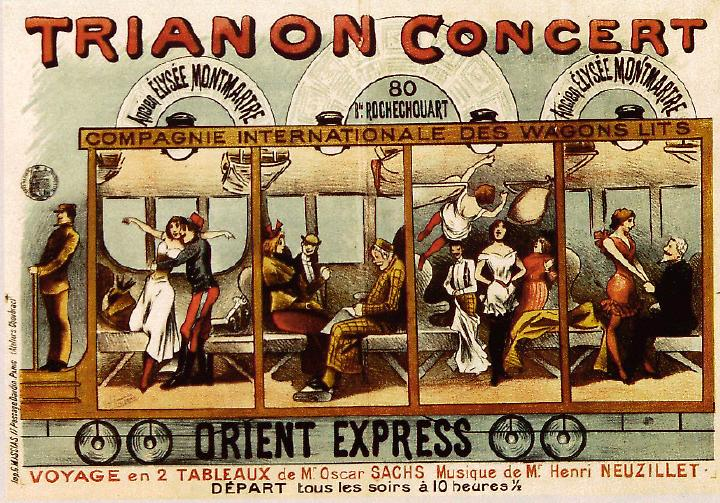
Advertising poster of the play "Orient-Express", 1896

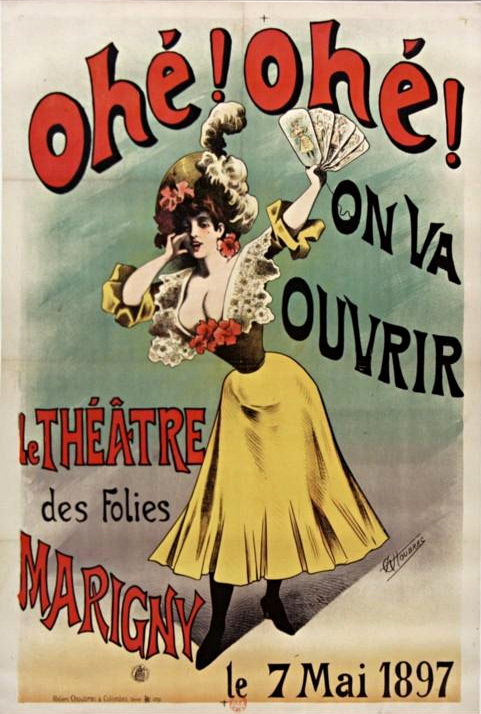
Poster Ohé Ohé On va ouvrir, Théâtre des Folies-Marigny, 1897

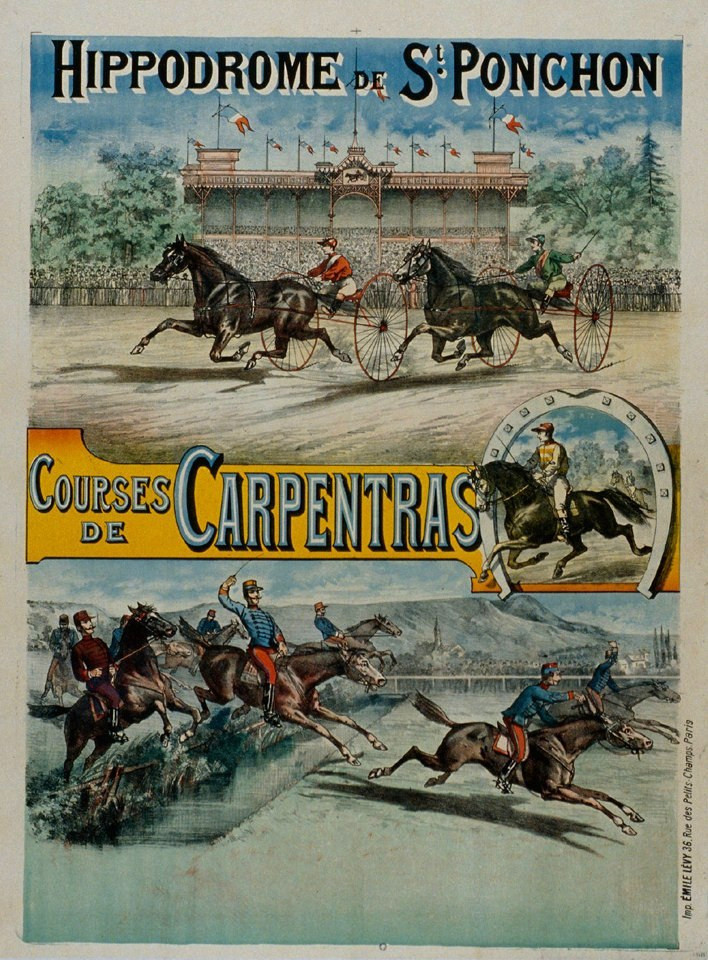
Advertising poster of the Hippodrome of Saint-Ponchon

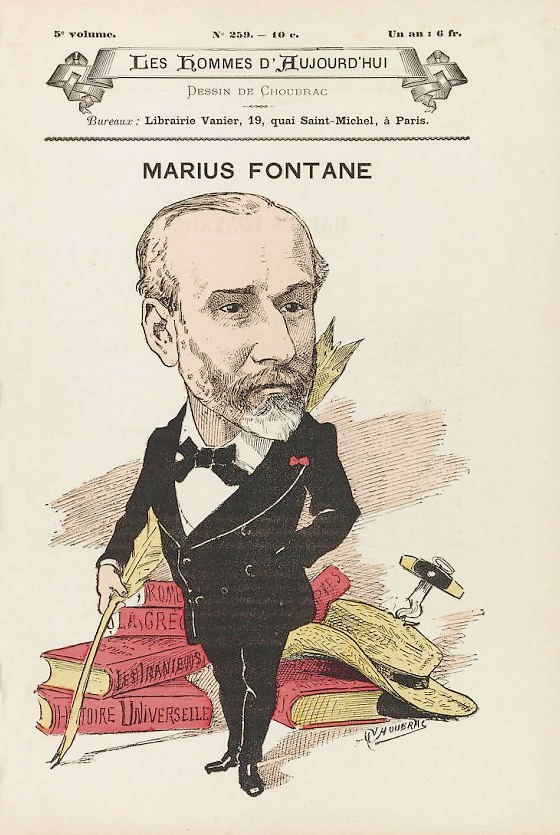
Portrait of Marius Fontane in Les Hommes d'aujourd'hui n°259, 1885

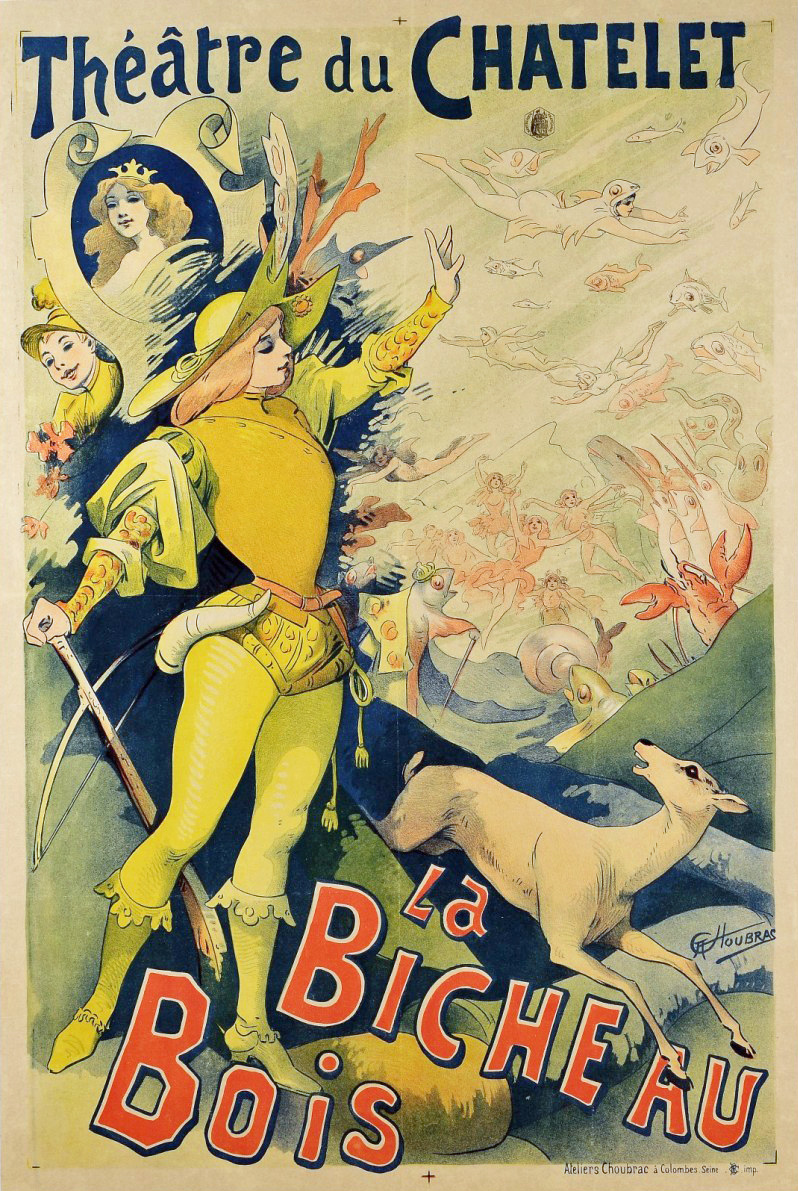
Poster for a Théâtre du Châtelet production of The White Doe

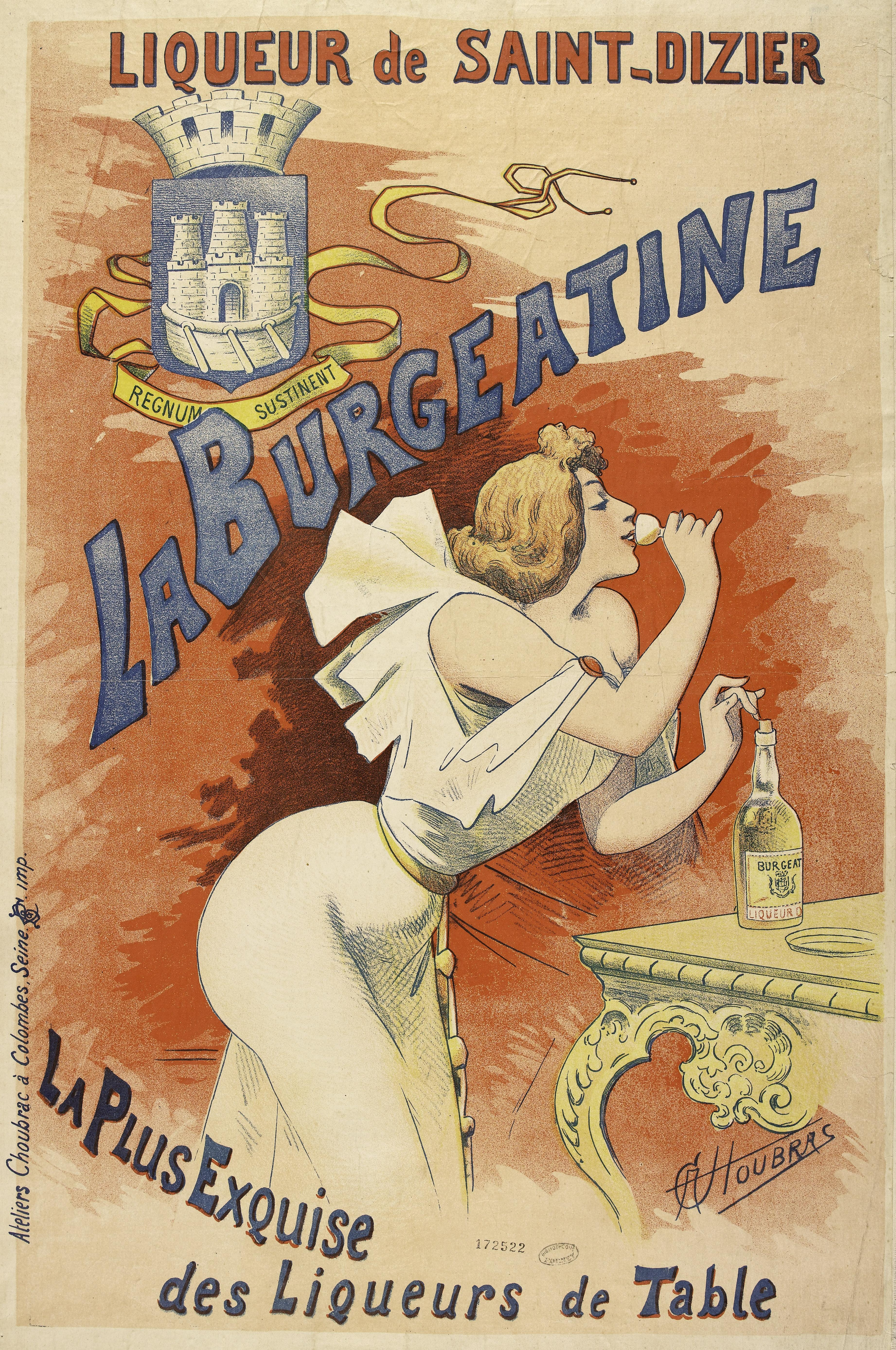
Advertising poster of La Burgeatine liqueur

== See also ==
- French painters

== Sources ==
- (in French) Beraldi, Henri (1886). Les graveurs du 19e siècle; guide de l'amateur d'estampes modernes, Paris: L. Conquet
- Brower, Abraham T. H. (1897). The International: An Illustrated Monthly Magazine of Travel and Literature, Volume 2, Chicago: Union Quoin Company
- Gold, Laura (1998). First Ladies of the Poster: The Gold Collection. New York: Posters Please ISBN 0-9664202-0-9
- Hiatt, Charles (1896). Picture Posters, London/New York: George Bell & Sons, MacMillan & Co.
- (in French) Maindron, Ernest (1896). Les affiches Illustrées (1886–1895), Paris: G. Boudet
- (in French) Martin, Jules (1897). Nos peintres et sculpteurs, graveurs, dessinateurs, Paris: E. Flammarion
- (in French) Rapazzini, Francesco (2016). Le Moulin Rouge en folies, Paris: Cherche Midi, ISBN 9782749154244
- Rickards, Maurice (1969). Banned posters. London: Evelyn, Adams and Mackay
- Verhagen, Marcus, The poster in Fin-de-Siècle Paris: "That Mobile and Degenerate Art", in: Charney, Leo & Vanessa R. Schwartz (eds.) (1995). Cinema and the Invention of Modern Life, Berkeley (CA): University of California Press, ISBN 9780520201125
