= Paula Brébion =

French singer and actress (1861–1952)

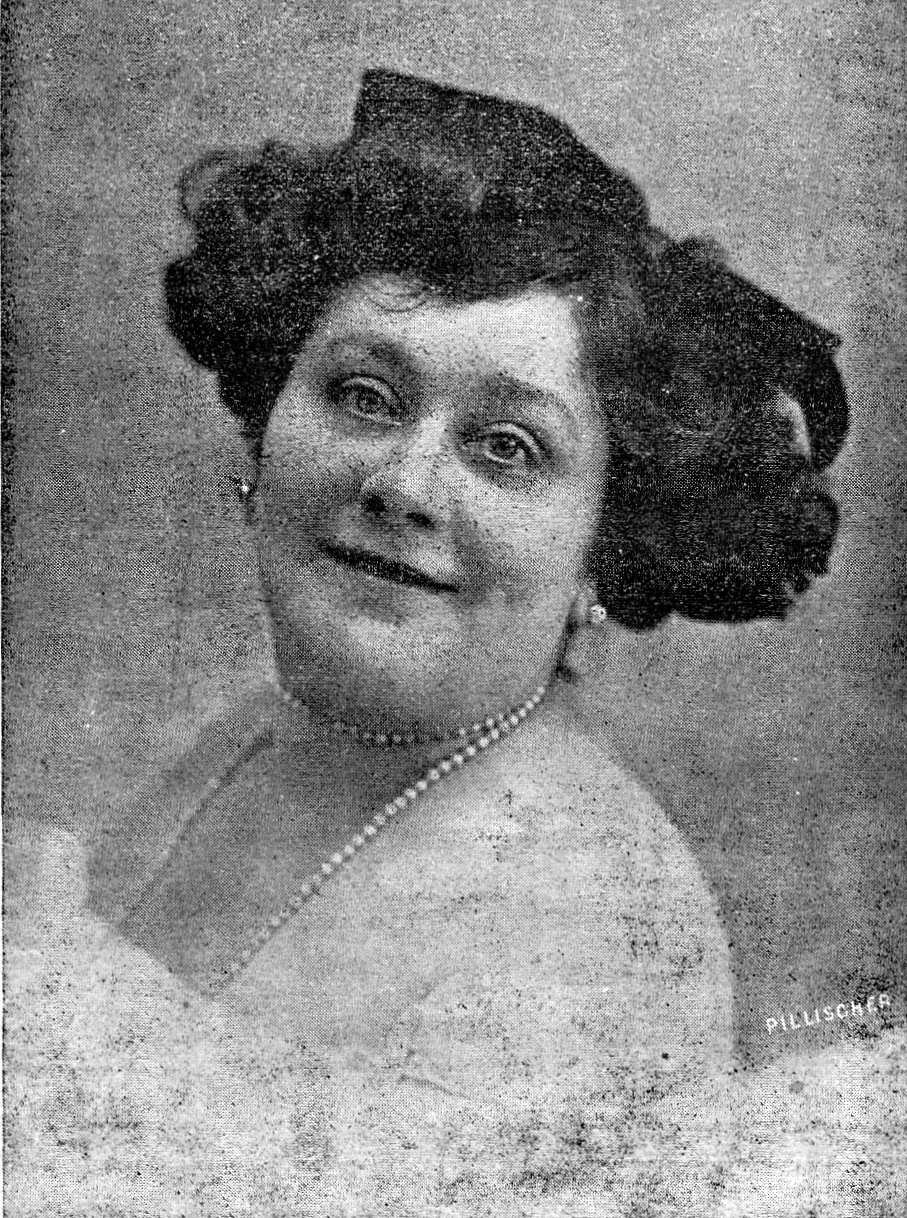
- Born: Marie Brébion; 26 May 1861; Paris, France
- Died: 21 July 1952 (aged 91); Toulon, France
- Occupations: Singer, actress

Paula Brébion (26 May 1861 – 21 July 1952) was a French singer and actress. Brébion began her stage career at the age of 6, first learning the trade in Paris from her mother, Marie Constance Joséphine Hersilie Brébion, who was also an actress, and then with mime Louis Rouffe and his troupe in Marseille. She had a huge success in the big concert halls of the French capital and in the provinces, performing light, saucy and patriotic songs, several dozen of which were her own creations. She was nicknamed "la Reine" (the Queen) and "l'Etoile de la Scala" (the Star of La Scala). She then turned to the theatre and performed in numerous plays in France and abroad.

== Early life and family ==
Paula Brébion was the daughter of Marie Constance Joséphine Hersilie Brébion, an 18-year-old dramatic artist, and an unknown father. She was born in Paris and originally called Marie. Her mother's sister was Maria Blanche, known as Blanche Brébion, a dancer and actress who made her debut at the Théâtre de la Gaité-Montparnasse in La Madonne des Roses. Her father and grandfathers are unknown. Paula Brébion's maternal grandmother was Françoise Joséphine Brébion born on 19 February 1820 in Courbevoie, the daughter of Louis Brébion and Marie-Claude Migeon, a Parisian launderers. She worked as a gold polisher.

== Early career ==
Paula Brébion later described herself as the "véritable enfant de la balle parisienne", beginning her career in 1867 at the age of 6 when she was introduced to the director of the Théâtre du Vaudeville where her mother played the great leading roles. She was engaged in small roles such as Vieux Caporal or Fugitif until 1876. In 1874, she played at the Théâtre Graslin in Nantes and returned in 1875 where she starred in the play Genova, in the company of another child, Géo Rémy. She was then hired by the director of the Alhambra theatre, Madame Pirola, for 180 francs a month. One day Pirola noticed her humming before going on stage and thought her voice was pretty, so asked her to try singing in the concert part of the show. The next day, with a certain amount of stage fright before the curtain rose, Brébion sang La Fille à Papa, a big hit by Anna Judic. She remained working at the Alhambra theatre until 1878 and was then engaged at the Alcazar theatre in Marseille.

At the age of 18, she gave birth to a daughter, Caroline Louise Alice Brébion, on 3 March 1879, at 48 rue Curiol, Marsailles. Louis Rouffe and Pierre Barbarini, both famous stage mimes, are mentioned as witnesses in the birth certificate, but no father's name was listed. In April 1879, she appeared on stage at the Alcazar where Rouffe and Barbarini were also performing. In 1881 she was living at 34 rue de la République in Marseille with Rouffe, (who remained married to Joséphine Gaudefrin and with whom he had had a daughter, Joséphine Marie known as Alida Rouffe). On 16 August 1882, Brébion shared the stage with him and other artists in the play Un Crâne sous la Tempête as part of a performance in honour of Ernest Vaunel, an actor leaving for military service.

== Success ==
After Rouffe's death in December 1885, Brébion returned to Paris where she was offered an opportunity to sing at the Eden Concert, but she did not fulfil her contractual commitment: she suffered from laryngitis and the Eldorado theatre, directed by Mr Renard, offered her a better deal. This breach of contract cost her 10,000 francs, which she only finished paying back in 1890. In August 1886, she had a huge success in the Eldorado theatre with the show Mathurin.

Having never had a singing teacher, Paula Brébion trained herself, creating light, bawdy and patriotic songs such as L'Aigrette, Mon Petit Tapin, La Mobilisation, Recommençons si tu veux and Les 15 jours d'un Oiseau. Considering herself a good musician, she was supported in her creations by the musicians Lucien Collin, Wachs, Liouville, Paul Foucher and her writers Gil (Eugène Hubert of La Figaro), Péricault, Lucien Delormel or Léon Garnier. She considered the public to be capricious and that to please an audience, one needed "spicy songs, natural Cayenne barely disguised in an aphrodisiac sauce". She said "we pay less attention to the artist than to her dress and, to please, it is better to have a 2,500 franc dress than a very pretty voice".

Singing in various Parisian theatres (the Eden-Concert, the Scala, the Bataclan (theatre), the Alcazar d'Été, the Café des Ambassadeurs), she also made several tours of the provinces. In April 1887, she was in Lyon, then returned to the Eldorado in October for its reopening after renovation. In 1888, she was in Vichy for the summer season and returned to the Eldorado in the autumn for the winter season.

She sang La Marseillaise at the Eldorado on the bank holidays of 13 and 14 July 1889. Deeply in love with her country, she refused offers to sing in Germany because she "hated the Prussians" and also resented the inhabitants of Antwerp: during one of her concerts, three spectators had to be expelled for protesting against one of her patriotic songs.

In 1890, after a season at the Alcazar d'Été, she signed a five-year contract at the Eldorado.

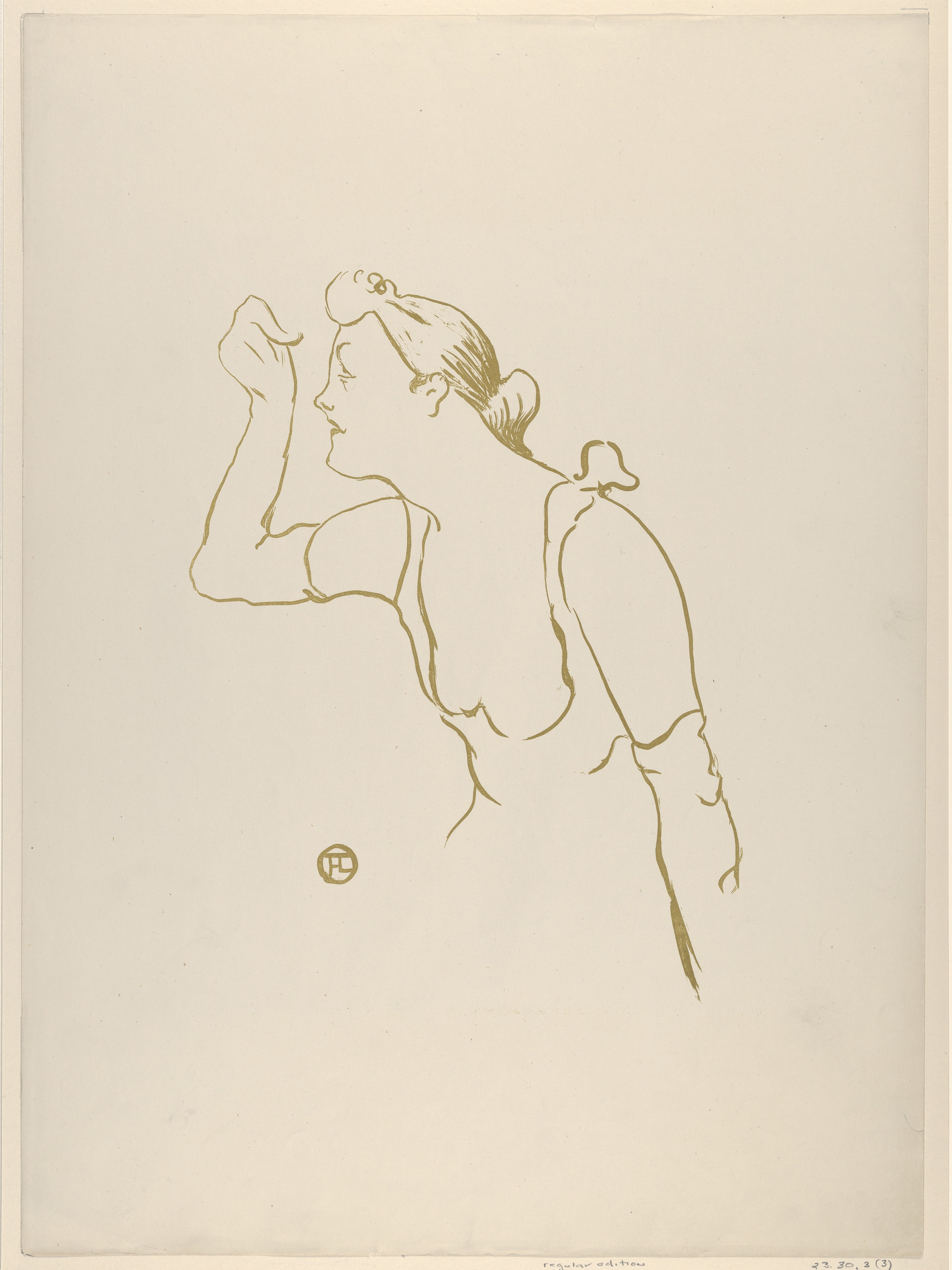
Paula Brébion (from Le Café Concert) by Henri de Toulouse-Lautrec

In May 1892, she almost died in a fire in her home (the Villa des Baisers) at No. 89 Grande Avenue in Saint-Maur-des-Fossés, after a lamp fell in her room. Her furniture, hangings, paintings, wardrobe and jewellery went up in smoke. According to contemporary newspapers, the damage was estimated at between 50,000 and 60,000 francs.

In 1893, she posed as a model for the painter Henri de Toulouse-Lautrec for a now well known lithograph, original versions of which are held in several museums. The image has since been reproduced on a range of goods.

In 1896, Brébion embarked on a tour abroad.

On 12 November 1903, she performed at the Eldorado with Dranem, Anna Thibaud, Eugénie Fougère, Harry Fragson, Felix Mayol, and several other singers in the matinee organised to raise money to support of the widow and orphans of the conductor Émile Galle.

Brébion was nicknamed "la Reine" and "l'Étoile de la Scala". She often received declarations of love, including a request from an admirer who asked her to send him a lithograph image to put at the foot of his bed.

She preferred to work rather than lead a double life of theatre and luxury like some café-concert artists of the time. She did not marry, claiming that marriage only made her bitter and disgusted, whereas work always made her happy.

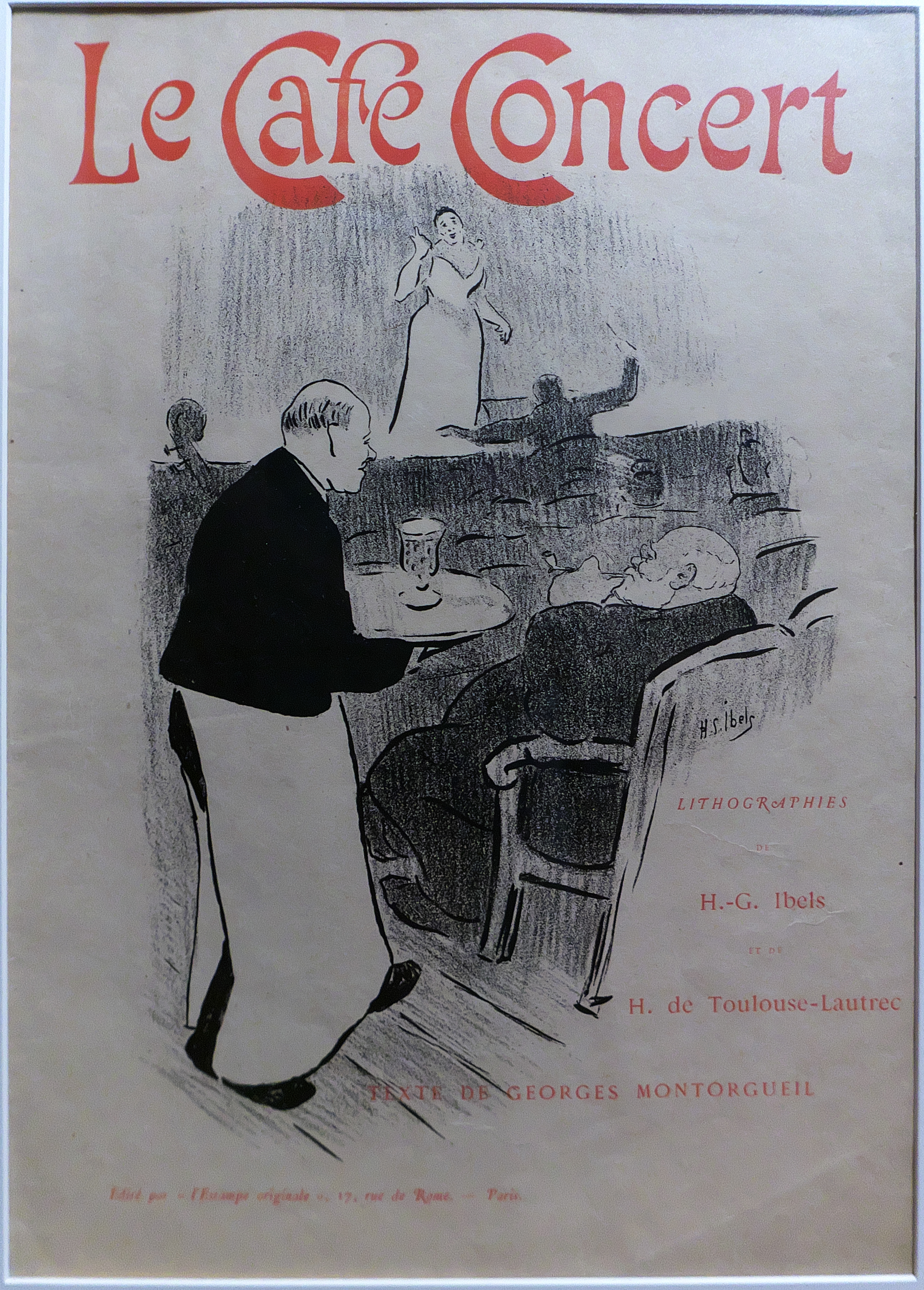
Litografía by Henri-Gabriel Ibels of Le Café Concert

With her successful stage career, she tried her hand as a tour manager, but later admitted to having lost sixty thousand francs "in this little game".

Seeing the decline of the café-concert scene, she decided to stop singing and turned completely to acting.

She acted in numerous plays, including Miquette et sa Mère, Sapho, La Présidente, La Sacrifiée, Poil de Carotte, La Belle Aventure, Zaza, Le Maître de Forges, Le Flibustier, L'Arlésienne, La griffe, and Le Secret de Polichinelle.

== Later career ==
In 1912, she was engaged for a year in Montreal (Canada), notably in the operetta Mam'zelle Nitouche and the play Le Roi at the Théâtre des Nouveautés. On her return, she was about to sign a contract for a long tour in France, but the First World War broke out. She then lived on her savings.

Having never contributed to her pension and having spent all the money she had earned during her successful years, Brébion left Paris to live alone in a small flat she rented in Asnières-sur-Seine. On 30 July 1927, Comoedia published a letter she sent in which she appealed to her artist friends for help. In return she received 1,320 francs. She then returned to the stage for some performances, notably in April 1928 at the Concert Mayol. In its 14 April 1929 edition, Paris-Midi announced that she was ill and in misery under the title Paula Brébion, ex-reine de la chanson attend du secours. A week later, L'Intransigeant ran the headline Que va-t-on faire pour Paula Brébion? She toured for two or three months a year but did not earn enough to survive. She asked the town hall of her commune for unemployment benefits but was refused because performing artists were no longer entitled to them there, unlike those living in Paris. Following an article about her in L'Intransigeant on 21 April 1929, the board of directors of the Casino de Forges-les-Eaux, on the prompting of actor Pierre Juvenet, decided to give the opening gala of the establishment, scheduled for 16 June 1929, as a benefit for the Brébion.

In a letter sent to the newspapers on 6 January 1932, Yvette Guilbert, wrote of her concerns for the fate of her fellow artist. "Paula Brebion, a former celebrity at La Scala and the Eldorado, also acclaimed in the concert cafés of Petersburg, Vienna, Turin, Milan, Florence, Naples, Madrid, Barcelona, Cairo, Brussels, etc., etc., was a great success, etc.. to whom Léon Vasseur, the famous composer, offered to create the operetta Mamz'lle Crénom, the one who was at the Théâtre des Folies-Dramatiques to play and sing La Reine de Golconde, and who, following in the footsteps of Judic and Jeanne Granier, became an actress after having been a singer, playing the comedy as far as America [sic], Canada, to come back to Brussels on all the stages, to Lyon, Bordeaux, Toulouse, Marseille, where the roles of the famous Desclauzas were entrusted to her, who toured Baret until the war stopped her work and forced the artist to eat her savings, to sell little by little her jewellery, her furs, her furniture, Paula Brebion, today left without any resources, must have recourse to public pity at the age of 72."

Paula Brébion was finally taken in by Félix Mayol in his Clos des Ameniers in Toulon, at the "Villa Fémina".

== Death ==
Paula Brébion died on 21 July 1952 in the Toulon civil hospital, rue Chalucet, aged 91. She was buried in Lagoubran Cemetery in common ground, Plot 2, Trench 9, Grave No. 60, in a 5-year plot which was not renewed. Her remains were later transferred to the ossuary.

== Career details ==
- 1874 31 December: Bonsoir et bonne année, poem recitation at the Grand-Théâtre de Nantes.
- 1875 (February): Genova au Grand-Théâtre de Nantes.
- 1883 La Bouillotte, spoken ditty, lyrics by Émile Carré, music by Albert Petit. Il était temps, song, lyrics by Émile Joinneau and Horace Delattre, music by Émile Spencer.
- 1885 (April): performed with Louis Rouffe, in the benefit performance given for Mlle Duparc.
- 1886 April: Le panier d'œufs, ditty, lyrics by MM d'Arsay and Baron, music by Henri Cieutat.

September: Ça fait plaisir aux filles by Paul Burani, Philibert and Robert Planquette.
October: Recommençons si tu le veux and Papa trombone, ditty.
L'an dernier, rondeau, lyrics by Gil, music by Paul Fauchey.
Winter: operetta by Firmin Bernicat, lyrics by Louis Péricaud.
1887 L'anniversaire d'une fauvette, song, lyrics by Paul Provansal, music by Alfred Hack
Le beurre fondu, narration, lyrics by Alexandre Blacher, music by Jules Deschaux.
Le capital de Lise, song created at the Eldorado, lyrics d'Yvaneski, music by Émile Spencer
1888 La cantinière du 113e, song, lyrics by E. Brissac, music by A. Perrey.
Ami, bonsoir!..., song, lyrics by L. Christian et René de Saint-Prest, music by Albert Petit.
Après vendanges!, ditty, lyric by Gil, music by Lucien Collin.
Les baisers du jour de l’an, song, lyrics by Émile Bessière and Félix Mortreuil, music by François Perpignan.
Le carême de l’abbé Pinson, ditty, lyric by Lucien Delormel and Gaston Villemer, music by Lucien Collin.
La porte du jardin at the Eldorado.
L'accroc de mon voisin at the Eldorado, lyrics by Lucien Delormel and Gaston Villemer, music by Frédéric Wachs.
L'amour sous un parapluie, ditty, lyrics by Lucien Delormel, music by Frédéric Wachs.
1888 September - February 1889: Pichenette, a Paul Burani vaudeville at the Eldorado Paris.
1889 (May- December): Expérience de M. de Torcy et Mlle Lucia au milieu des lions du dompteur Star. C' n'est rien!, ditty, lyric by Gil, music by Frantz Liouville.
C'est la faute au p'tit vin d'Suresnes, spoken ditty, lyrics by Albert Morias, music by Jules Deschaux.
C'est pas fini!, ditty, lyrics by Louis Marcel and Éloi Ouvrard, who also composed the score.
La pêche au goujon at la Scala.
Changement de garnison at la Scala and at the Eldorado.
Le plumet de Cupidon at the Eldorado.
L'exercice at the Eldorado.
c. 1890 L'orpheline de Paris, romance, lyrics by René Esse, music by Gaston Maquis.
1890 C'est la pomme!, ditty, lyrics by Albert Semiane, music by Félicien Vargues. Je voudrais la lune at la Scala.
J'veux bien qu'on recommence at the Eldorado.
1891 La dernière gavotte at l'Alcazar d'Été, Sous les saules at the Eldorado.
1892 9 April: concert with Yvette Guilbert et Marguerite Deval. September: Les treize jours d'un parisien, vaudeville-opérette by Benjamin Lebreton and Henry Moreau, music by Albert Petit, at la Scala (Paris). October–December: Nos voisins, comédie-bouffe de Benjamin Lebreton and Henry Moreau at la Scala (Paris). Le départ des bleus at la Scala.
1893 January–February: Cambriolons by Louis Battaille and Julien Sermet at la Scala (Paris). February–March: Carnaval conjugal, folie carnavalesque at la Scala (Paris). March: Mévisto at la Scala (Paris). Le petit Noël de papa at la Scala.
1895 Un oiseau dans un corset at the Eldorado. Il était trois petits soldats.
1897: La Bobinette, chanson grivoise, lyrics by Francisque Corbié.
after 1900: La Petite Fanchette, ditty, lyrics by Félix Mortreuil, music by Gabriel Bunel.
1903: Sous les pommiers at la Scala.
1904 J'ai croqué la pomme. Monsieur le curé y a passé! at la Scala.
1905 La Griffe, dramatic play by Jean Sartène at Bataclan. Tête à l’huile, vaudeville by M. Lafargue. Les petits fourneaux à la Scala. Créatures d'amour at Petit Casino.
1906 Les deux pêches à l'Eldorado. La journée des adieux. Nos frontières.
1907 L'ordonnance du colonel ou Le briquet du colonel at la Scala.
