= Salle Wagram =

Coordinates: 48.8767°N 2.2969°E

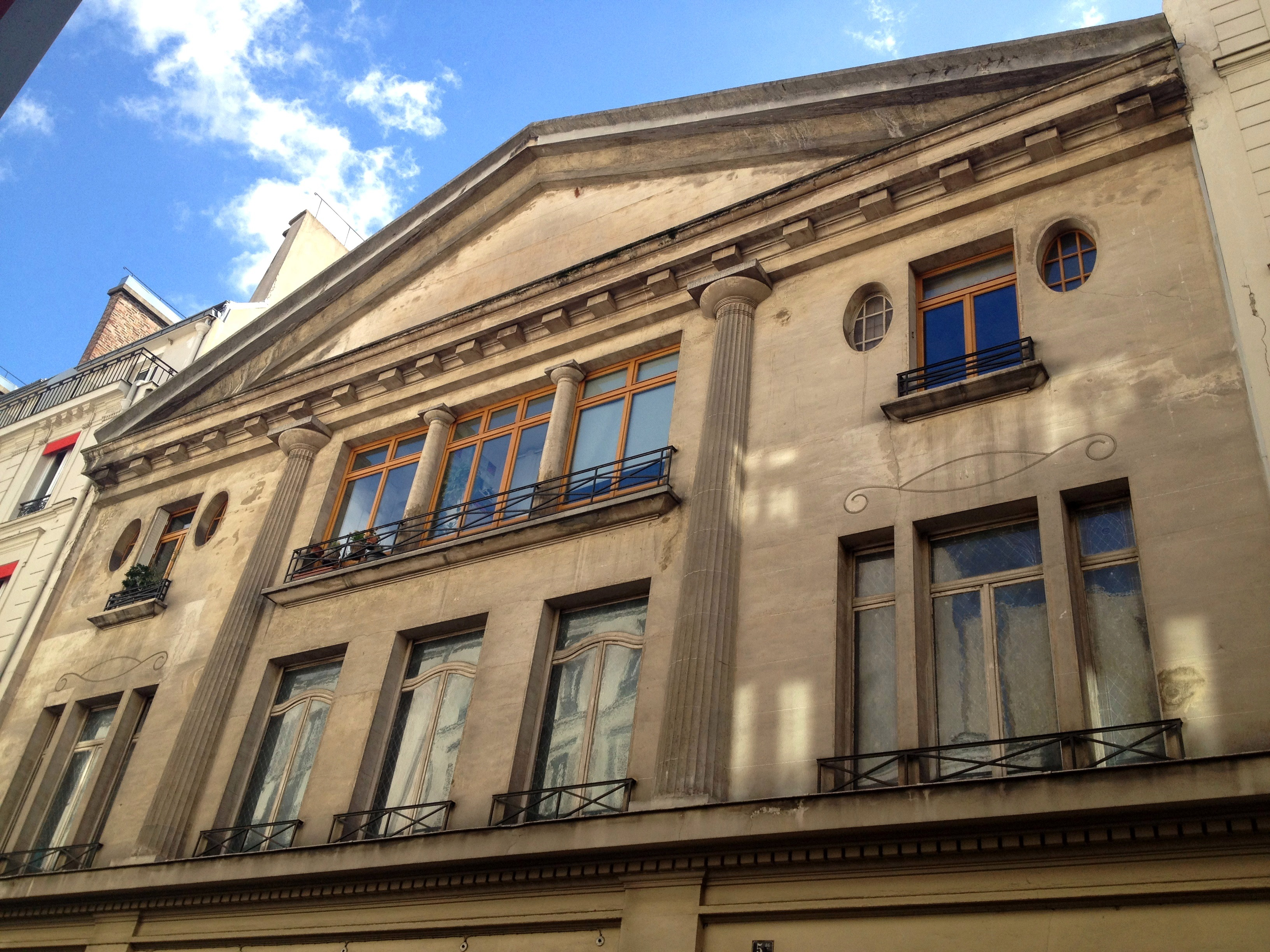
- Exterior view of Salle Wagram, September 2013
- Interactive map of the Salle Wagram area

General information
- Location: 39-41 avenue de Wagram, Paris, France
- Completed: 1865

The Salle Wagram is a historic auditorium in the 17th arrondissement of Paris, France. It was built in 1865. It has been listed as an official historical monument by the French Ministry of Culture since March 2, 1981.

First built in 1812 as the Bal Dourlans, the huge ballroom was designed by Adrien Alphonse Fleuret, and has been the setting for international congresses, political conferences, fashion exhibitions and dance competitions.

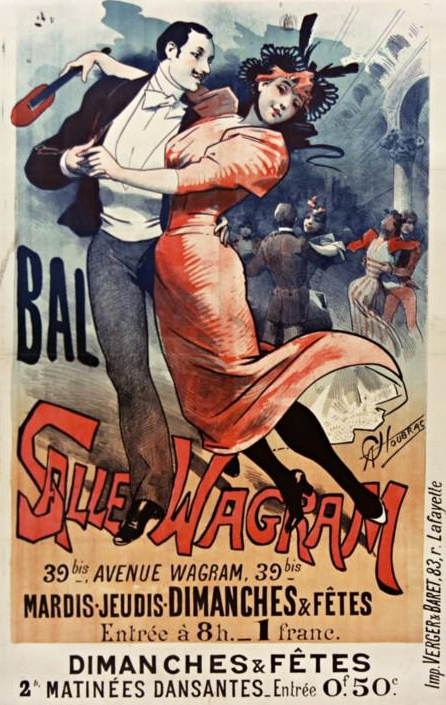
Advertising poster Salle Wagram by Alfred Choubrac, 1890

From the 1950s the hall was much used as a classical recording venue, including a Beethoven symphony cycle with the Paris Conservatoire Orchestra conducted by Carl Schuricht, Stravinsky ballets with the same orchestra under Pierre Monteux, the complete Carmen with Maria Callas and Nicolai Gedda, and in the 1990s for many Poulenc recordings with the French National Orchestra under Charles Dutoit.

In August 2000 La Traviata from Paris had the orchestra and conductor, Zubin Mehta in the Salle Wagram, while singers were on location around Paris.

From 2016 the hall, then equipped for 800 spectators for orchestral concerts, became the home of the Orchestre Colonne.
