= Octave Pradels =

French poet, novelist, vaudevilliste and lyricist

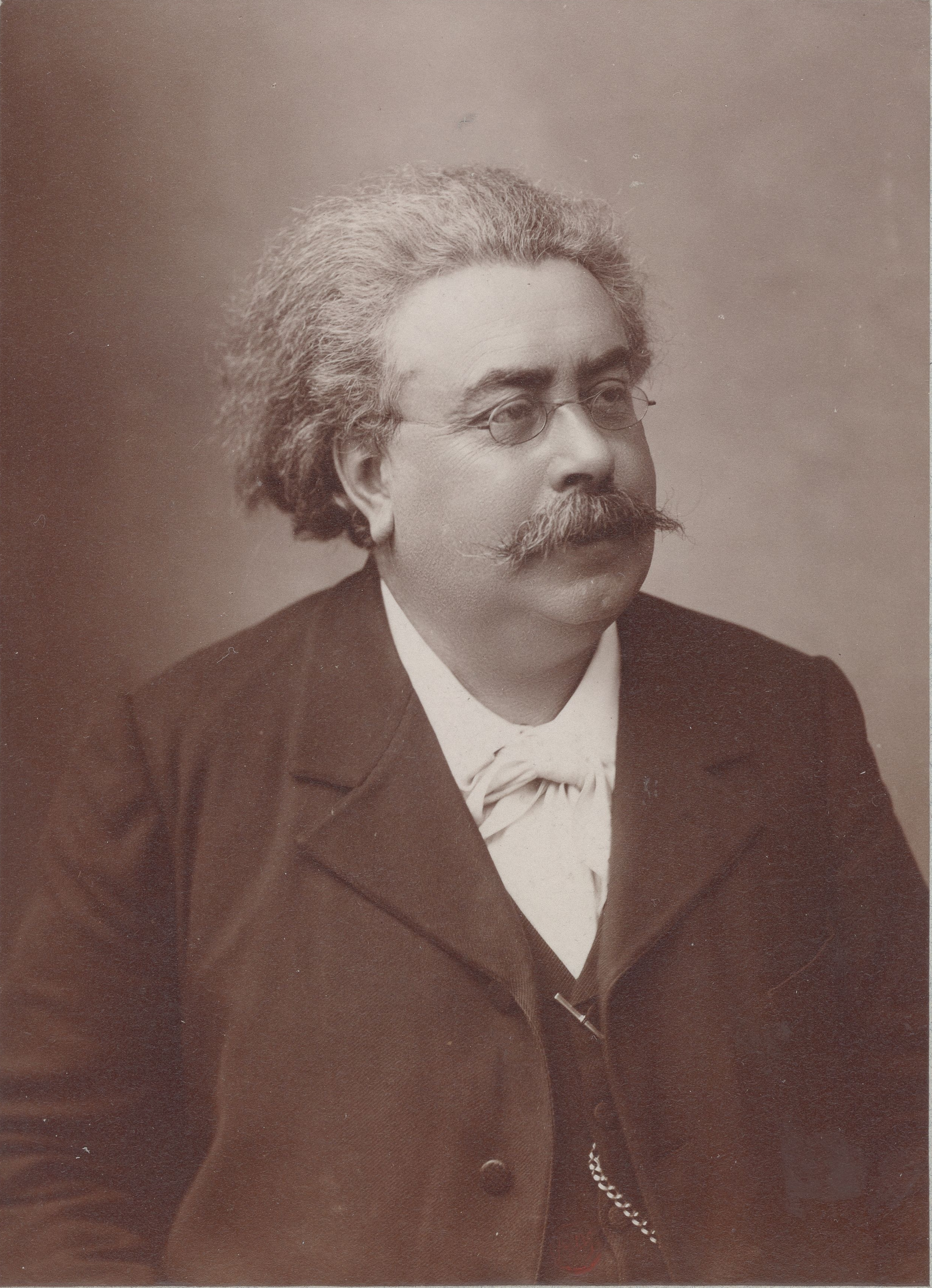
- Octave Pradels by Nadar.
- Born: 15 February 1842; Arques, Pas-de-Calais, France
- Died: 30 April 1930 (aged 88); Parmain, Seine-et-Oise, France
- Occupations: Poet, novelist, vaudevilliste, lyricist

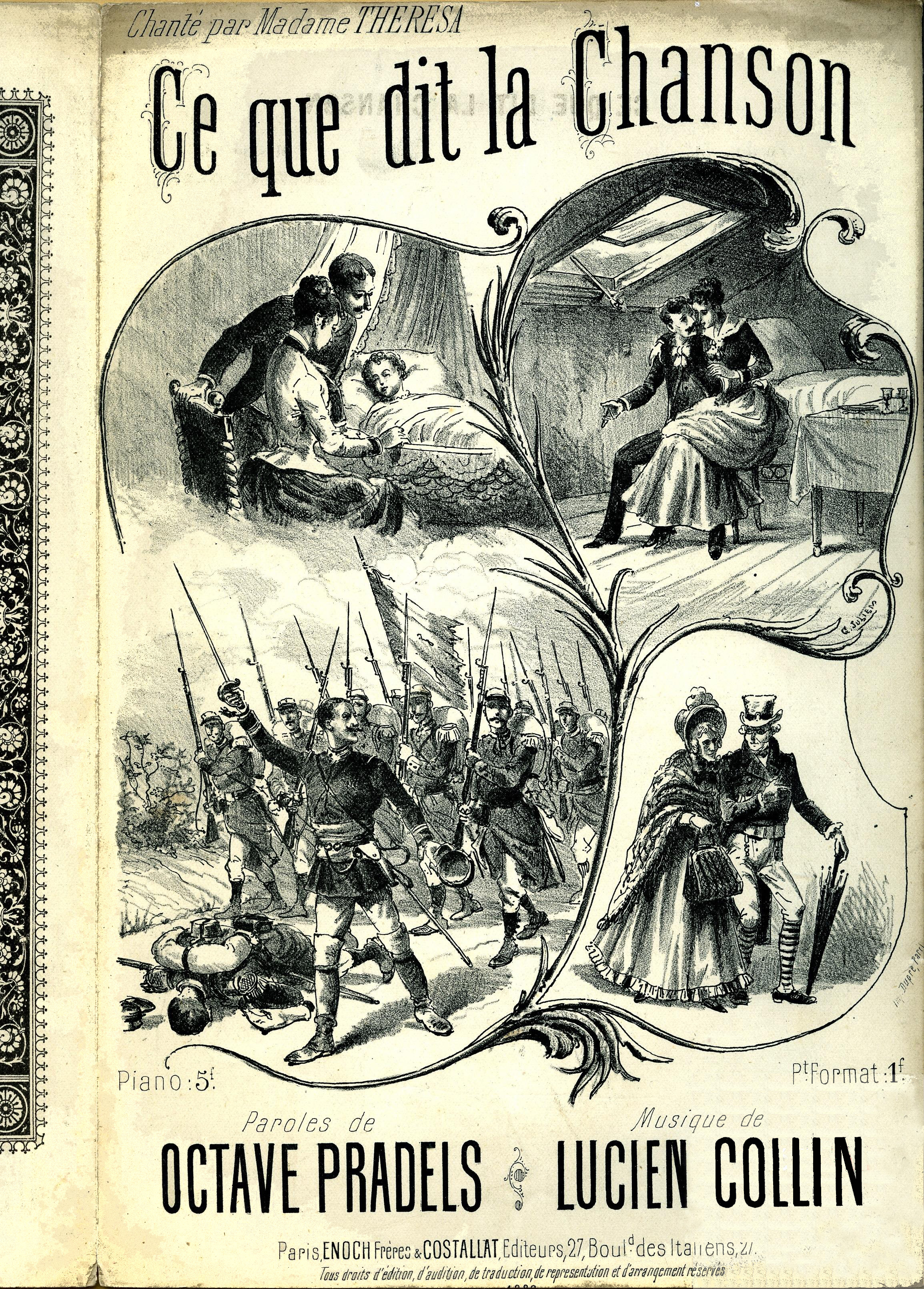
Lyrics by Pradels, music by Lucien Colin.

Monologue Rupture de banc.

Octave Pradels (15 February 1842 – 30 April 1930) was a French poet, novelist, vaudevilliste and lyricist.

== Biography ==
Octave Frederick Pradels published his first monologues, tales in verse and songs in 1883.

Among his greatest successes were Ça commençait si gentiment, La Chula, Dans l'oasis, Marche lorraine (written in collaboration with Jules Jouy). His songs were created in particular by Kam-Hill, Anna Judic, Amiati (at the Eldorado) and Thérésa.

A director of the Théâtre des Capucines, Octave Pradels was also president of the SACEM from 1895 to 1898.

After a first marriage in 1865 in Villefranche-sur-Mer, with Angélique Thérèse De Villa-Rey, daughter of a commander of the Monaco Marine, who gave him a first son, Édouard Joseph, Pradels supposedly married the divette Maria Theresa Mirbeau in 1873. They had a son, unrecognized by the mother, Edmond André, born 26 July 1878 in the 17th arrondissement of Paris, who collaborated with his father as lyricist and composer under the pseudonym Edmond Aramis. He died for France in Fort Vaux at Vaux-devant-Damloup (Meuse), 9 April 1916. In 1917 Octave Pradels remarried with Marie Louise Fransurot.

Octave Pradels took great pride of having given his two sons to France. Imbued with the chauvinist and revanchist mentality that arose after the capitulation in 1871, he contributed throughout his career to the dissemination of this feeling. Evidence is given by this excerpt from the words of this Marche Lorraine written in 1892:

Tes fils n'ont pas dégénéré,
Sol sacré !
Adoré !
Dans leurs veines encore ruisselle
Du sang de la Pucelle !

== Paulus's memories ==
In 1906, he started helping the singer Paulus to write his memories which would be published from 1907.

Paulus's memoirs were not published as a volume, but via the equivalent of booklets or black and white magazines sold each week. Rich in a sumptuous iconography, these notebooks contain reproductions of the cited figures, scores, but also small contextual ads.

== Theatre ==
- 1887: L'Agent de la sûreté de Marseille, Marpon et Flammarion BnF 31146038n Read online
- 1905: Agence matrimoniale, coll. Auteurs célèbres, Flammarion BnF 311460379
- 1886: Chansons, monologues, chansons à dire, fantaisies, préface d'Armand Silvestre, éd. Paul Ollendorff, Paris, BnF 31146052 Read online
- 1887: Rupture de banc, Librairie théâtrale, Paris, BnF 31146106 Read online
- 1888: Les Amours de Bidoche, Marpon et Flammarion, Paris, BnF 31146043 Read online
- 1889: Pour dire entre hommes, Marpon et Flammarion, Paris, BnF 31146099 Read online
- 1890: Robert Daniel, Flammarion, Paris, BnF 31146105 Read online
- 1891: Les Desserts gaulois, Marpon et Flammarion, Paris
- 1907: L'Héritier des Monlardon, Publications littéraires illustrées, Paris, BnF 31146068 Read online
- 1910: Fleurs de Gaule, poésies gaillardes..., Louis-Michaud, Paris, BnF 31146062 Read online
- 1913: Le Vin et la Chanson, Flammarion, Paris, BnF 31146117 Read online

== Bibliography ==
Octave Praedels on Wikisource

- André Chadourne, Les Cafés-concerts, E. Dentu, Paris, 1890 BnF 30215586 Read online
- Chantal Brunschwig, Louis-Jean Calvet, Jean-Claude Klein, Cent ans de chanson française, coll. Points actuels, Éditions du Seuil, Paris, 1981 ISBN 2-02-00-2915-4 (1re éd. reliée)
- Serge Dillaz, La Chanson sous la IIIe République (1870-1940), Tallandier, 1991 ISBN 2-235-02055-0
