= Alcazar d'Été =

Former café-concert in Paris, France

Coordinates: 48.8677°N 2.3176°E

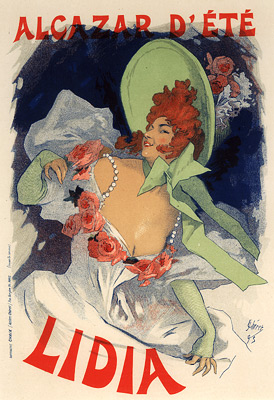
- Poster of Jules Chéret for Alcazar d'été (1895)

- Location within Paris
- Address: 8 Avenue Gabriel; 8th arrondissement of Paris; France
- Designation: Café-concert

Construction
- Opened: 1860
- Closed: 1914

The Alcazar d'Été was a café-concert which opened in 1860, at 8 Avenue Gabriel in the Jardin des Champs-Élysées in the 8th arrondissement of Paris, and closed in 1914.

The old site of what was then the Café du Midi or Café Morel behind the Élysée Palace, an establishment dating back to 1830, was acquired in 1860 by Arsène Goubert (fr) who at the time was owner of the Alcazar at 10 Rue du Faubourg Poissonière. Seeing the opportunity to retain his winter clients during the hot summer weather, and adding a restaurant, he gave it the name Alcazar d'Été, and the Alcazar became Alcazar d'Hiver.

Situated in one of the most attractive districts of Paris and in the open air, it had the distinct advantage in the summer season of fresh air, whereas the other stuffy indoor, gaslit establishments, generally poorly arranged from the point of view of ventilation, became suffocatingly insupportable in the summer months. Most closed their doors for the summer season and the clientele moved to the Champs Elysees, where the cafconc' stars entertained under the trees in the lamplight at the summer Alcazar and the Café des Ambassadeurs.

Goubert signed on the singer Thérésa. Within a month, she enjoyed great success both with the public and critics, and from 1864 to the Universal Exhibition of 1867 in Paris, she ensured the success of the two Alcazars. The clientele at the summer Alcazar was very mixed, because of the promenoir that encircled the room. However, from 1867 onwards when Thérésa had left, it was surpassed by the Café des Ambassadeurs closeby, which was more chic and attracted a more upmarket clientele. Nevertheless, the café-concert had its heyday during the Belle Époque in Paris and the Alcazar d'Été still attracted many of the main artists around, such as Paulus, Polin, La Belle Otero, Mistinguett, Yvette Guilbert, Fragson, Paula Brébion and Eugénie Fougère.

In 1886, Goubert opened En Revenant de la Revue (Returning from the revue) at the Alcazar d'Été, which became a tremendous success, mainly because of the personal magnetism of the legendary performer, Paulus, who very intense, scorched the stage as he paced frenetically with his top hat and cane. The title referred not a theatrical performance, but to a military review, and Paulus took advantage of the popularity of the revanchist and populist politician General Boulanger to mention him in a reworked verse of En revenant de la revue on France's national day, 14 July 1886. The new version became the anthem of the Boulangist movement that many feared could have taken over power through a coup d'état.

The First World War put an end to its use, when the Red Cross transformed it into a depot. In 1918, it was transformed into a skating rink and, shortly afterwards, a dance palace. Closed at the end of the 1920s, the building remained unoccupied until after the Second World War, when it was once again used as a depot for the materials of the Marshall Plan. Completely transformed, it is now known as the Pavillon Gabriel with meeting rooms for seminars and conferences.

== Sources ==
- (in French) Caradec, François & Alain Weill (1980). Le café-concert, Paris: Hachette/Massin ISBN 2-01-006940-4
- Leslie, Peter (1978). A Hard Act to Follow: A Music Hall Review, New York: Paddington Press ISBN 0-7092-0466-3
