= Concert Mayol =

Former cabaret in Paris, France

Coordinates: 48.871°N 2.35°E

The name Concert Mayol refers to a former cabaret situated at 10 rue de l'Échiquier in the 10th arrondissement of Paris.

Opened on the site of the former convent of the Filles-Dieu by MM. Valentin Fournier under the name Concert parisien, this café-chantant was an important venue to perform in for the artists of that period: Paulus in 1882 (direction Musleck) then, from 1894 under the direction of Dorfeuil, Yvette Guilbert, Dranem, Max Dearly, etc. It is the place where Félix Mayol made his Parisian debut 1 May 1895. The entrance was then at 37 rue du Faubourg-Saint-Denis.

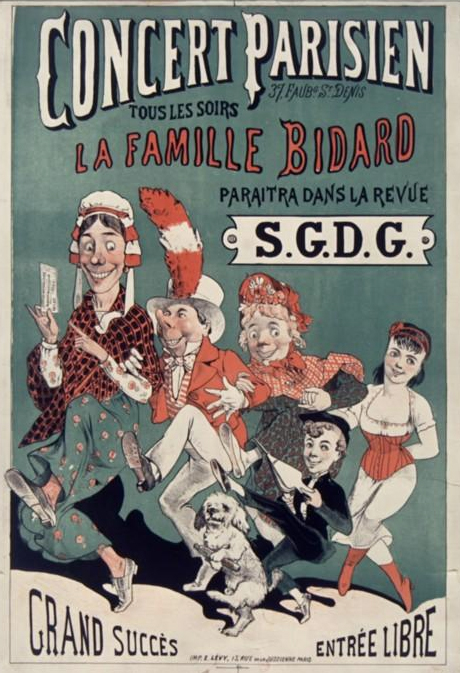
La famille Bidard (1880)

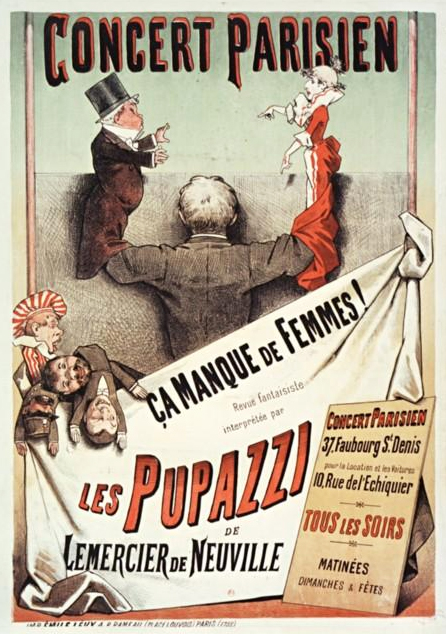
Ça manque de femmes ! show with the Pupazzi by Lemercier de Neuville (1884)

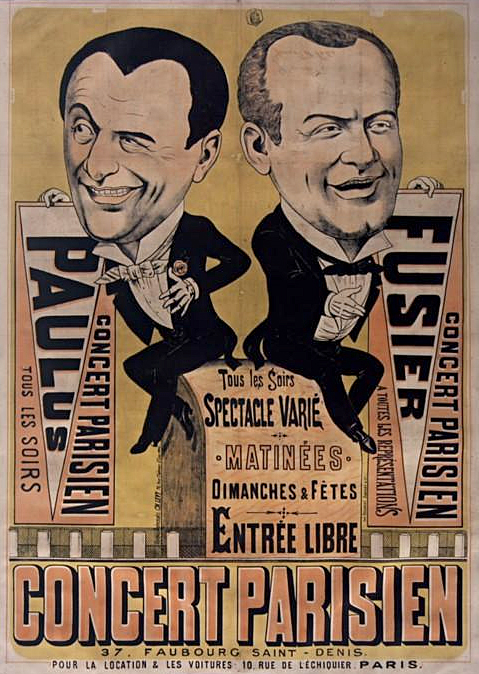
Paulus and Fusier (1885)

Yvette Guilbert (1900)

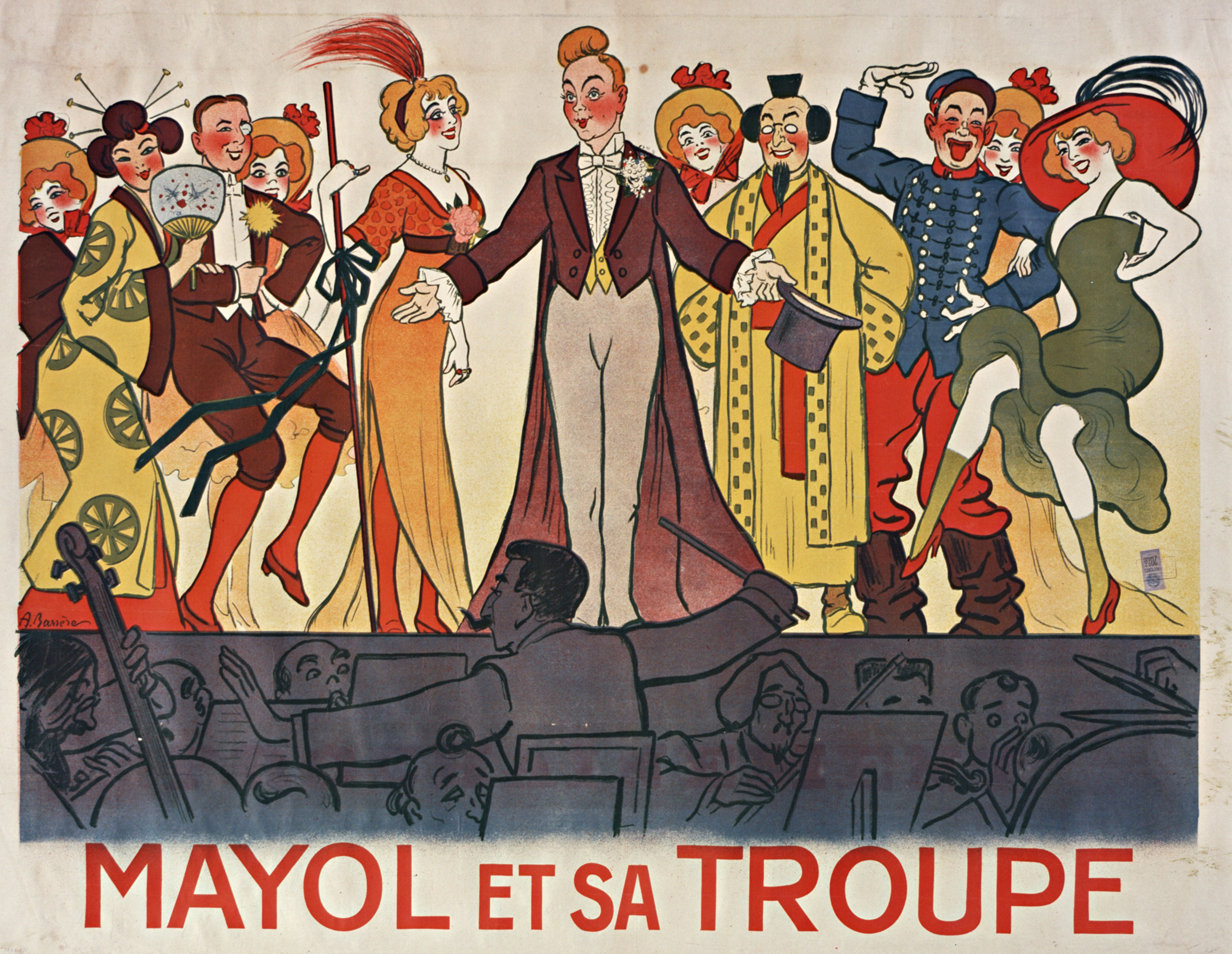
Mayol and his troupe (poster by Adrien Barrère, 1915)

Once he had become famous, Mayol acquired the establishment in 1909 and gave it the name Concert Mayol. Having moved the main entrance rue de l'Échiquier, he produced shows of which he was the star and in turn launched young artists including Valentin Sardou, Maurice Chevalier and Raimu.

In 1914 he gave away the management to Oscar Dufrenne who dedicated the venue to music-hall in setting up, in collaboration with Henri Varna, extravaganza shows. Gina Palerme, Marie Dubas, Lucienne Boyer, Émile Audiffred, Gaby Montbreuse, Fernandel, Parisys and many other French artists performed in that venue. In 1933 Saint-Granier succeeded him and, after renovation, created an operetta that enjoyed great success. In 1934, André Denis and Paul Lefebvre specialized in "nude" reviews. After World War II, it did not find its audience back and vegetated in presenting strip-tease shows until it definitively closed down in 1976.

== See also ==
- List of former or demolished entertainment venues in Paris

== Sources ==
- Félix Mayol, Mémoires (souvenirs racontés à Charles Cluny), Louis Querelle, Paris, 1929
- André Sallé, Philippe Chauveau, Music-hall et Café-concert, Bordas, Paris, 1985.
- François Caradec, Alain Weill, Le Café-concert (1848-1914), Fayard, Paris, 2007 ISBN 978-2-213-63124-0
