= Lulu on the Bridge =

- Theatrical release poster
- Directed by: Paul Auster
- Written by: Paul Auster
- Produced by: Greg Johnson; Amy J. Kaufman; Peter Newman
- Starring: Harvey Keitel; Mira Sorvino; Willem Dafoe; Gina Gershon; Vanessa Redgrave; Mandy Patinkin
- Cinematography: Alik Sakharov
- Edited by: Tim Squyres
- Music by: John Lurie; Graeme Revell
- Production company: Capitol Films
- Distributed by: Trimark Pictures
- Release date: August 14, 1998 (Norway)
- Running time: 103 minutes
- Country: United States
- Language: English

Lulu on the Bridge is a 1998 American romantic-mystery drama film written and directed by author Paul Auster and starring Harvey Keitel, Mira Sorvino, and Willem Dafoe. The film is about a jazz saxophone player whose life is transformed after being shot. After discovering a mysterious stone, he meets and falls in love with a beautiful aspiring actress, but their happiness is cut short by a series of strange, dreamlike events. The film was screened in the Un Certain Regard section at the 1998 Cannes Film Festival.

== Plot ==
Jazz saxophone player Izzy Maurer (Harvey Keitel) is shot in the chest during a performance at a jazz club by a deranged man. Izzy survives the seven-hour operation, but loses his left lung, ending his music career. A young aspiring actress named Celia Burns (Mira Sorvino) walks into the Chez Pierre restaurant in New York City where she works as a waitress. She and her boss talk about the shooting. Later she purchases Izzy's latest CD. (Note: In the opening scene, the walls of the jazz club bathroom are decorated with photos of beautiful women. One of the photos is of an aspiring actress named Celia Burns whom he will meet later. Next to her image is a photo of Louise Brooks, the actress who played Lulu in the 1929 German silent film Pandora's Box.)

Following his recovery, Izzy stays to himself and avoids his friends. Gradually he ventures outside and adapts to his new life. His former girlfriend Hannah (Gina Gershon) invites him to a dinner attended by a retired famous actress, Catherine Moore (Vanessa Redgrave), who is now a successful film director, and her film producer friend, Philip Kleinman (Mandy Patinkin). For the first time in a long time he has a good time. Catherine is looking for a young, unknown actress to play the part of "Lulu" in her upcoming film version of Pandora's Box. Walking home that night Izzy discovers a dead body, finds a bag lying nearby, and rushes home in fear. Later he examines the contents of the bag and finds a small box containing a stone with a red mark. As he examines the stone he hears voices speaking in foreign tongues.

That night, as he lay awake in bed, the stone emits a strange blue light and elevates above the nightstand. The next morning he calls the number written on a napkin he found in the bag and Celia picks up the phone just as she's listening to Izzy's CD. He asks to meet, and she invites him over. When he arrives he demands to know what she knows about the dead man, Stanley Mar (Greg Johnson), and the strange rock. He turns out the lights and shows her the rock's mysterious blue light. Drawn to the rock, Celia touches it and encourages him to touch it too. "It's the best thing, it really is. It's like nothing else," she says. They feel elated by the experience, which makes them feel more connected to everything around them. He tells her, "The way I feel now, I could spend the rest of my life with you." After he leaves, Celia runs after him and invites him back to her apartment where they make love. In the coming days, they fall deeply in love. She gets him a job at her restaurant, but when a customer comes on to her, Izzy causes a scene and they both get fired.

Celia is up for a part in Catherine's film, Pandora's Box, and with Izzy's help and connections, she gets the part of Lulu. (Note: The character of "Lulu" was created by Frank Wedekind in his plays Erdgeist (Earth Spirit) and Die Büchse der Pandora (Pandora's Box).) Izzy plans to meet Celia in Dublin, where the film is being shot. Shortly after she leaves, Izzy is attacked by men in his apartment demanding to know why he killed Stanley Mar. He is taken away and held prisoner. He meets a mysterious Dr. Van Horn (Willem Dafoe) who tells Izzy how disappointed he is in him. Izzy has no idea what he's talking about, but Van Horn seems to know details about Izzy's past—his real name, childhood incidents, and catching fireflies with his brother at their summer house on Echo Lake. When Van Horn begins to delve into Izzy's relationships with his father and brother, Izzy responds, "Don't do this to me." When reminded that he refused to play music at his father's funeral, he breaks down in tears. One night, Van Horn storms into Izzy's cell and tell him, "You're not worthy. You've lived a bad dishonest life." Having learned about Celia, Van horn now demands that Izzy reveal her whereabouts. Izzy refuses to acknowledge that he even knows her. As he leaves, Van Horn says, "May God have mercy on your soul."

Meanwhile, Celia is unable to reach Izzy and she suspects that something is very wrong. She fears that Izzy has abandoned her. One night she takes out the rock and the blue light appears, but now it only produces in her an overwhelming sadness. Distressed, Lulu takes the rock and walks to Ha'penny Bridge, where she drops the stone into the dark river below. The following day, Van Horn and his men find Celia in Dublin and attempt to kidnap her. They chase her through the streets to Ha'penny Bridge where she had dropped the stone. As they close in, she jumps into the river.

Back in New York, Izzy finally manages to escape his prison. He learns of Celia's disappearance from her producer and nearly collapses. The producer gives him a videotape of some of Celia's scenes. Later at a jazz club, he asks his friends, "Am I a good person or a bad person?" Back at his apartment he watches the videotape of Celia and weeps.

After being shot at the jazz club by the deranged man, Izzy is taken away in an ambulance. On the way to the hospital, his heart stops and Izzy Maurer dies, just as the ambulance passes a young aspiring actress named Celia Burns. She sees the ambulance pass and makes the sign of the cross.

== Cast ==
- Harvey Keitel as Izzy Maurer
- Mira Sorvino as Celia Burns
- Willem Dafoe as Dr. Van Horn
- Gina Gershon as Hannah
- Vanessa Redgrave as Catherine Moore
- Mandy Patinkin as Philip Kleinman
- Richard Edson as Dave Reilly
- Don Byron as Tyrone Lord
- Kevin Corrigan as Man With Gun
- Victor Argo as Pierre
- Peggy Gormley as Dr. Fisher
- Harold Perrineau as Bobby Perez
- Sophie Auster as Sonia Kleinman
- Greg Johnson as Stanley Mar
- David Byrne as 'Laughing Man' Escort
- Lou Reed as 'Not Lou Reed'
- Holly Buczek as Dying Girl
- Slava Schoot as Russian Thug
- Henry Yuk as Chinese Thug
- Fred Norris as German Thug
- Brian McGuinness as Pursuer #1
- Neil Donovan as Pursuer #2
- Socorro Santiago as Paramedic #1
- O.L. Duke as Paramedic #2

== Production ==
=== Screenplay ===
Lulu on the Bridge was Paul Auster's directing début. He had previously written the script for The Music of Chance, and had collaborated with director Wayne Wang on Smoke (1995) and Blue in the Face (1995).

=== Casting ===
Auster felt fortunate in his casting of the film, stating, "I wanted all the people that are in the film, and I asked them. Many of them I knew—that was my casting technique."

Auster had hoped to cast Salman Rushdie as Dr. Van Horn. Demands for increased wages on the part of the Teamsters, due to the perceived increased danger of having Rushdie in the cast, could not be met and the part went, on short notice, to Willem Dafoe.

=== Filming locations ===
- Dublin, County Dublin, Ireland
- Ha'penny Bridge, Dublin, County Dublin, Ireland
- New York City, New York, USA

Some CGI Effects were handled by New York-Based Company Blue Sky Studios.

== Release ==
The film premiered in Norway on August 14, 1998, and in France at the Deauville Film Festival on September 6, 1998. The following month the film was released in France, Poland, and Spain. The film was released on DVD in the United States on September 21, 1999.

It is distributed internationally by the Indian-based Flair Communications, who has acquired rights to the film in 2026.

== Reception ==
On Rotten Tomatoes, the film has an approval rating of 0%, based on 8 reviews. Emanuel Levy of Variety wrote, "The film is original and intermittently touching, but ultimately frustrating due to the meandering nature of the riddle-like script and Auster’s lethargic direction."

== Soundtrack ==
In April 2006, the original music soundtrack was released on CD on the Blue Note label (4953172).

1. "Close Your Eyes" by Mira Sorvino (0:57)
2. "Sugarcraft" by Medeski, Martin & Wood (3:18)
3. "Izzy's Last Jam" by Don Byron (3:03)
4. "Cumba's Dance" by Jacky Terrasson (2:00)
5. "Make It Go Away" by Holly Cole (4:00)
6. "Je Me Souviens d'Unechanson" by Edith Piaf (2:46)
7. "Voices from Box" by Paul Auster (0:57)
8. "The Blue Light" by Graeme Revell (4:47)
9. "On the Roof" by Graeme Revell (2:28)
10. "Devil Drums" by Raymond Scott Quintette (3:38)
11. "Dolorosa (Stabat Mater)" by Giovanni Pergolesi (4:37)
12. "Easy – Don't Hurt" by Ike Quebec (6:04)
13. "Traveling Miles" by Cassandra Wilson (4:52)
14. "Goodbye Celia" by Graeme Revell (1:05)
15. "Estranha Forma de Vida" by Amália Rodrigues (3:14)
16. "Finale" by Graeme Revell (4:45)
17. "Singin' in the Rain" by Lena Horne (4:17)
