= Eugénie Fougère =

French vaudeville and music hall dancer

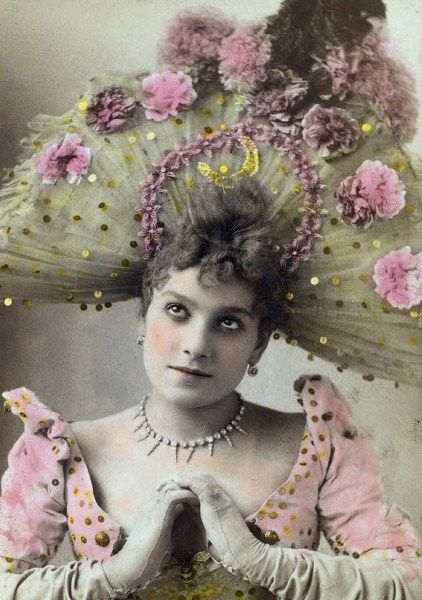
- Eugénie Fougère in 1893 (Picture by Napoleon Sarony)
- Born: 12 April 1870; Strasbourg, France
- Died: 6 February 1946 (aged 75); Paris, France
- Occupation: Vaudeville performer

Eugénie Fougère (12 April 1870 – 6 February 1946) was a French vaudeville and music hall dancer and singer. She was often called a soubrette − a flirtatious or frivolous woman − known for her eye-catching outfits, frisky movements, suggestive demeanor, and for her rendition of the popular "cakewalk dance," which in her own style included "negro" rhythms and paces. She should not be confused with the frequenter of the French demi-monde also named Eugénie Fougère although the two knew each other, mixed in the same circles and even lived in the same street in Paris for a while.

Fougère, despite her image as a frivolous dance-hall star, was also an innovator. According to one theatre critic "this wild little diva was always dressed in the most outlandish outfits, resplendent in the most incongruous colours" but was also "a precursor who introduced the repertoire of foreign songs and dances from every country into the café-concert well before this repertoire became fashionable".

== Early life and career ==
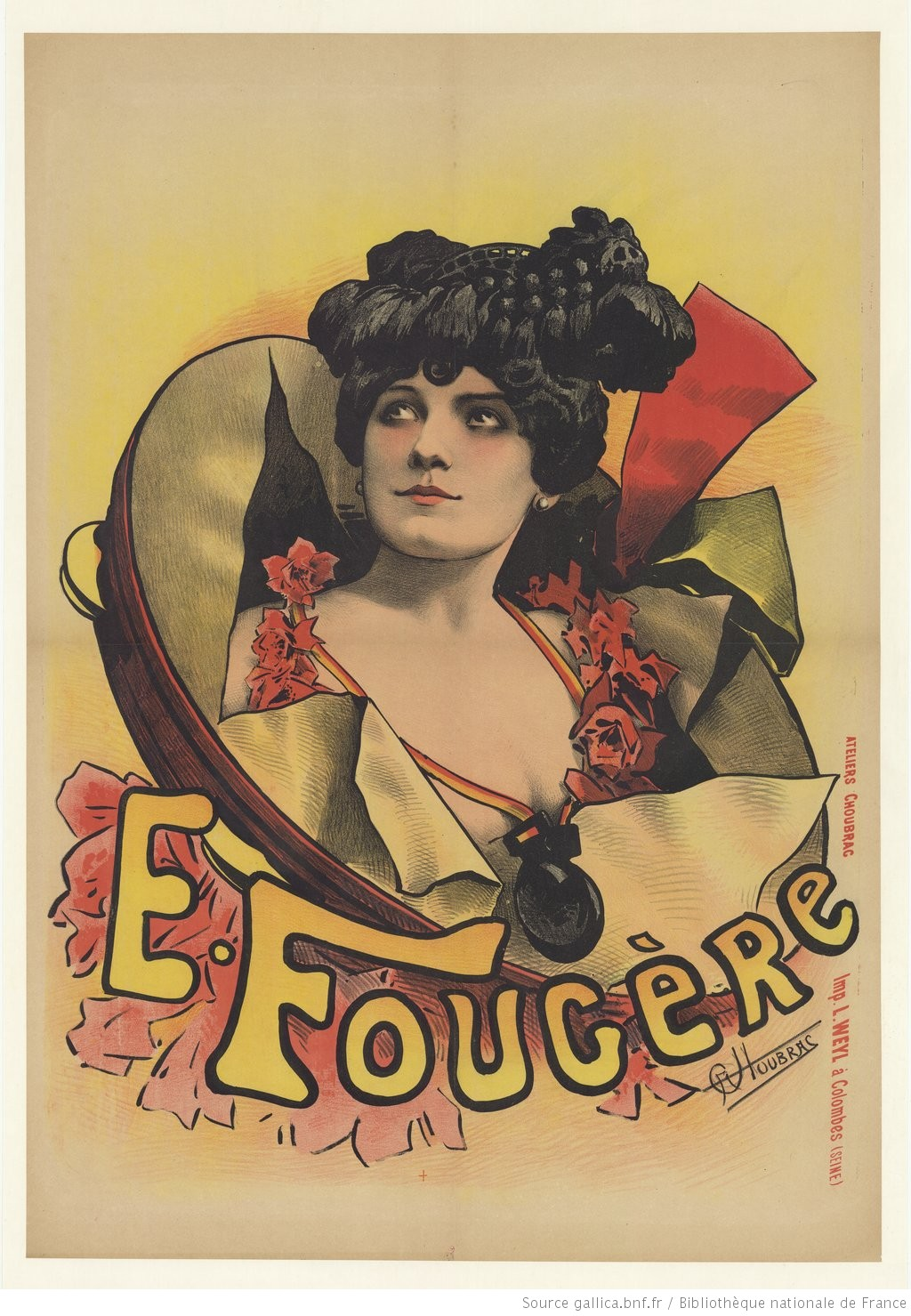
Eugenie Fougère ca. 1890 (Poster by Alfred Choubrac)

Fougère's past is shrouded in mystery, not in the least because she herself contributed to the ambiguities by creating dual identities in real life and on stage. According to some sources she was either from Spanish or Spanish-Jewish descent, but it is more likely that her true identity was confused with her first artistic success as a Spanish singer and dancer, known as "fausses Espagnoles" (fake Spaniards), with the stage name Fougeros.

After the murder of her namesake in 1903, Fougère complained about the confusion over the name, about which the two ladies had argued in the past. Fougère claimed that she was the rightful bearer of the name, but according to an article in Le Petit Parisien that reported on the murder, Fougère was most likely born as Faugère, in Strasbourg. Her birth certificate shows that Fougère was born out of wedlock as Eugénie Philippine Faugère in Strasbourg, the natural daughter of Jean Faugère, a soldier in the 16th artillery regiment from Puylaurens (Tarn), and an Alsatian woman, Catherine Kistler, a seamstress born in Herrlisheim (Bas-Rhin). She had an older sister, Justine Joséphine, born in Metz in 1861, known as Juliette, who also was a vaudeville artist.

Eugénie became a native of Avignon in her early youth. After the 1870-1871 Franco-Prussian War, her father, who had spent twenty-one years in the army, came to Avignon in Southeastern France with the Strasbourg pontonniers regiment, accompanied by his concubine and daughters. There, he married the sister's mother in 1872, and having left the army, became a tailor. Originally from Alsace-Lorraine, Eugénie became a naturalised French citizen after the Franco-Prussian War (when Alsace and northern Lorraine were annexed to the new German Empire in 1871), shortly after her parents' marriage. (Note: According to another source, based on an interview with Fougère, she was born in Marseille on 12 April 1870. Her father died in Avignon, at the age of 53, on 31 October 1883 when Eugénie was 13-years old. Her mother, the widow Catherine Faugère, known as Fougère, died in 1894.)

Her first appearance on stage was at the age of 12 in Avignon, and subsequently in Marseille at 14. At the age of 15 she started her career at the Café des Ambassadeurs in Paris, where she would live the rest of her life. Fougère became a popular excentric singer (gommeuse) and dancer that performed in famous theatres, such as the Folies Bergère, Alcazar d'Été, La Scala (fr) and L'Olympia. The gommeuse was regarded as a sensual object and a "symbol of madness, of Parisian life", and the frenzy of Paris in the last decade of the 19th century:

Gommeuses were "eccentric singers" whose particular characteristics consisted in extravagant silliness of the costume and coiffure (underwear and an enormous hat were of major importance for the gommeuse). Raising their voluminous skirts, they cavorted and contorted their bodies with epileptic gestures and movements, they "shook, leapt around, twisted, and stuck their tongue out."

== Cake walk ==
Fougère dancing the cake-walk c. 1899, filmed by Frederick S. Armitage.

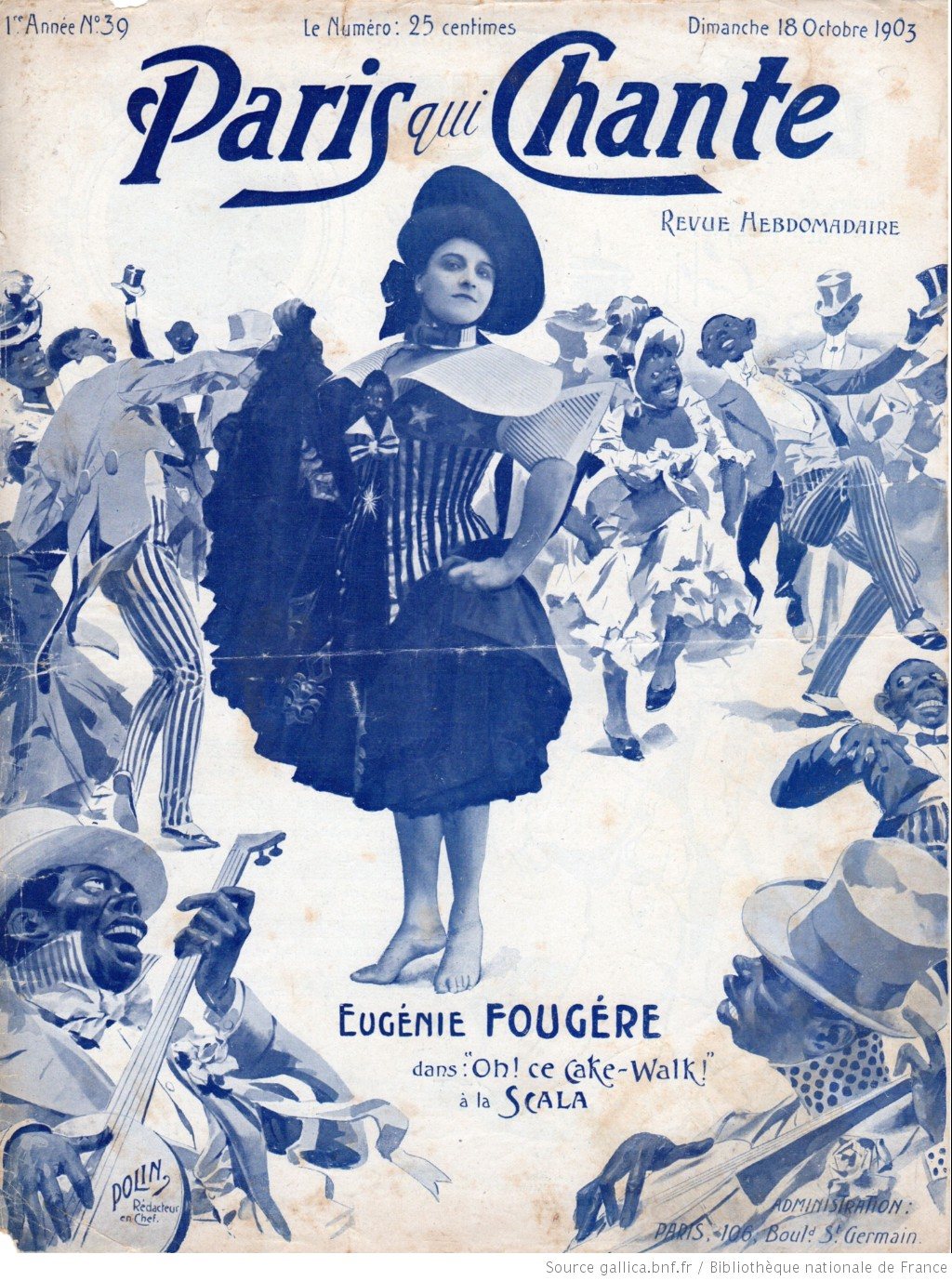
Eugénie Fougère on the 18 October 1903 cover of Paris qui Chante dancing to the song 'Oh ! ce cake-walk'

The "frenzied divette" was, in the art of music hall, a precursor, introducing songs and dances of all countries, long before that became fashionable in the café-concert circuit, while wearing the most unlikely toilets, bedecked with paradoxical colours. Just like Polaire and Mistinguett, she became known for her "racially ambiguous" dancing techniques that she applied to ragtime and the popular "cake walk" dance of the time, which became a rage at the end of 1902. She is said to have introduced the dance in Paris in 1900 in the Théâtre Marigny after she returned from a tour in the United States, where she had been filmed in 1899 in the rag-time cake-walk "Hello, Ma Baby," with which she made a sensation at the New York Theatre, filmed by Frederick S. Armitage.

The ambiguous "cake walk" became very popular quickly. For a few months in 1903, Paris was in the grip of a veritable 'cake-walk craze' (folie du cake-walk) or cake-walkomanie, after a popular song. Fougère appeared on the October 1903 cover of Paris qui Chante dancing to the song Oh ! ce cake-walk, which she performed barefoot at La Scala, much to the delight of the audience, seduced by this originality. The lyrics interconnected African and American dance, monkeys and epilepsy – reflecting the racist and colonial attitudes that prevailed at the time. A popular theorist of "negro dance," Andre Levinson, observed that it was impossible for Europeans to recreate the moves seen by African dance, and that is why the public was amazed by it.

While describing a revue at La Cigale near Place Pigalle in Paris in 1920, where she appeared in the costume of an American negro, Rae Beth Gordon, a professor in French literature, notes that "at least in this original fantasy, she told the journalist, 'I felt my old self again.' The incorporation of blackness by this white singer suggests that the motivations for adopting a black persona and the effects of such a masquerade went beyond the purposes of simple exploitation. Fougère felt more at home in a black body — or, at least, in a body ruled by black rhythms and movements — than she did in a white body deprived of the opportunity to express itself with no holding back."

== In the United States ==
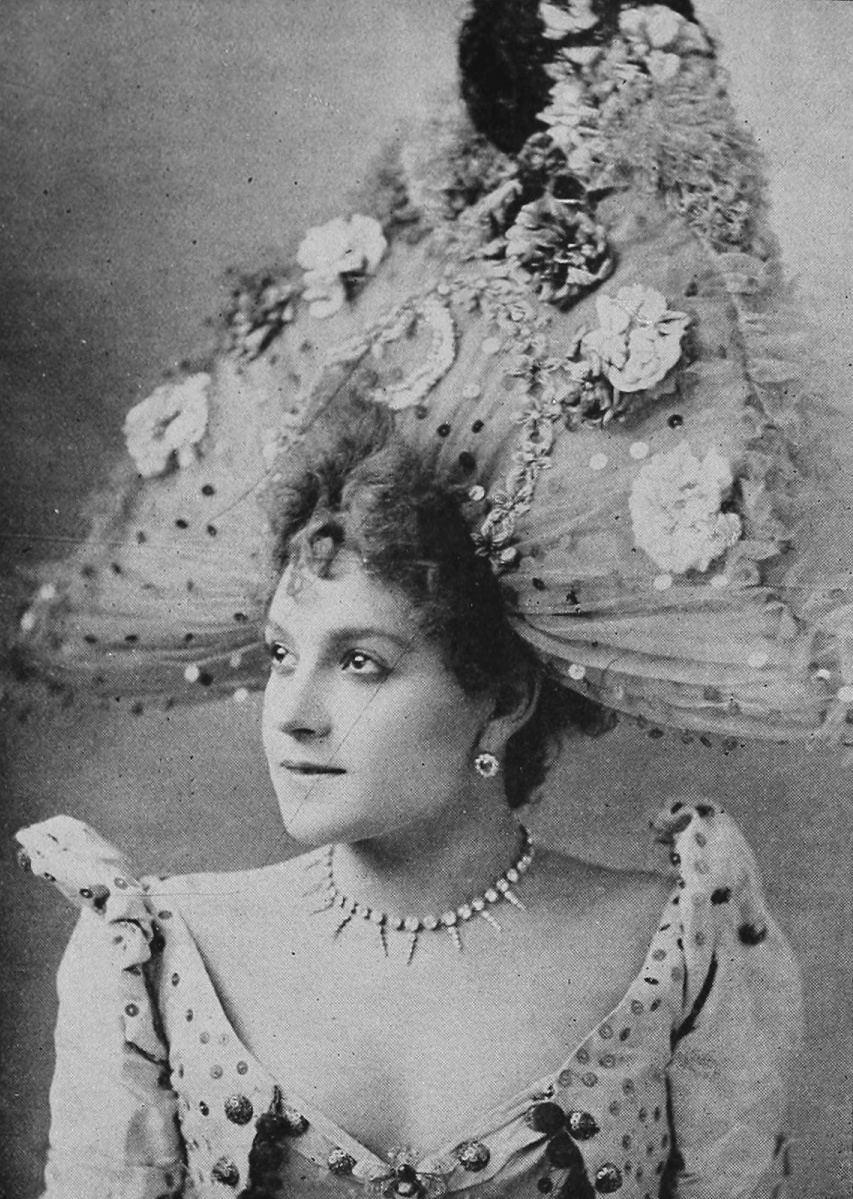
Eugénie Fougère, the naughtiest of French dancers (Metropolitan 1895)

The 'audacious' Fougère made her debut in the United States on 7 September 1891 at Broadway's Koster and Bial's Music Hall in New York – the gayest night spot in town at the time – where her "scandalously risqué" performance quickly became "the craze of the hour". According to a review, "New York never saw anything to equal the performance of Fougere. Imagine an Apache in a setting of petite Parisian femininity." Her influence over the audience was due "to the sparkle, wildness and vim of her performance". According to another theatre critic she "flashed the real bottom facts of her sex in the eyes of the public. It was daring, but the police did not interrupt it." Not everyone was impressed; theatre critic Leander Richardson called her "the most daring interpreter of indecency" and wrote that she dealt "in just plain sexual dirt, and looks the part".

She was something of a trailblazer, launching a wave of 'unconventional' dancers and singers from across the ocean. According to New York's Metropolitan Magazine in 1895:

Fougere is another French visitor, and she keeps the people talking about her extraordinary antics on the stage. She has returned to us again, after a visit to her dear Paree, and once again we can treat ourselves to the spectacle of a woman who can turn her clothes inside out practically, dress and undress before an audience, and do various other things with a sang-froid and a rapidity that take away one's breath and leave the weak-minded in a state of total collapse. There would be a panic should she turn herself loose before an audience in Skowhegan, Maine, but the New York music-hall patron has become accustomed to things that are unconventional, and beyond an occasional nervous twitch at one of her suggestive verses, Fougère is accepted in New York as a matter of course—not to say a coarse matter.

Fougere became one of "the high-priced music hall singers", according to Metropolitan Magazine, who was never out of an engagement, spending her time performing between New York and Paris:

Fougere is said to be quite wealthy, and to own a pretty little villa near Paris. Notwithstanding the vivacity and positive recklessness which she displays on the stage, she is said in private life to be rather demure. One would not think so, however, after taking a glance at some of her pictures. She is one of the most photographed women in the world, and even Lillian Russell is not more familiar with photographs than is Fougere.

Fougère toured the States for many years during the Gay Nineties and the early 1900s, but her performance was often too 'strong' for the audience. Due to complaints about the audacious performances of Fougère and other European music-hall artists, Koster and Bial's had to set new restrictive rules about the artist's dresses and song texts for the 1894 theatre season. She was a hit at the Los Angeles Orpheum, but was hissed off the stage in Kansas City. "The people think I'm — ah — what you say? Naught-ee?," she commented. "Ah. monsieur, they don't understand. They will learn. Ah, these Americans, they are just a little slow, but they all like 'the great Fougere' when they know her. But, o-o-ooh ! I'm all breathless, c'est terrible!" In 1907, impresario Willie Hammerstein paid her $700 a week (equivalent to $24,187 in 2025) while playing in his Hammerstein's Roof Garden vaudeville theatre in New York City.

Her performances often shocked the puritan North Americans and revealed their hypocrisy. In October 1907, while she was performing at the Gaiety Theater in Washington DC, she was brought to the police station where she had to pay a "cash security of $50 to insure her good behavior." Despite the fact that the police sergeant enjoyed her show on the front row, in particular her "specialty", he nevertheless said he was shocked and dragged her off to the police station. Her controversial performances in the U.S. did not stop her from parodying the Gibson Girl – the quintessential perfect archetype of the upper middle class American girl – in Parisian theatres.

== "Extravagant" ==
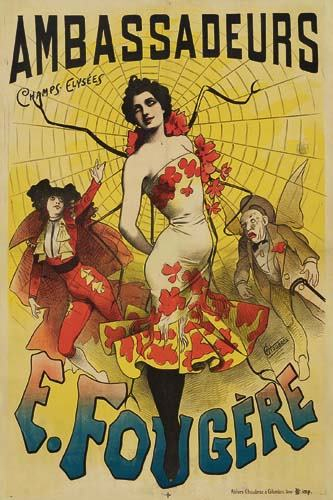
Eugenie Fougère at the Parisian café-concert Café des Ambassadeurs. Here she is depicted as a sexy incarnation of a spider, attracting and catching men in her web. (Poster by Alfred Choubrac)

Often described as "extravagant", Fougère was a very dynamic, elusive and noisy whirlwind of talk and gestures. In addition to the U.S., she performed all over the world. She was particularly fond of Italy, where she made her debut in 1895 at the café-chantant Salone Margherita (it) in Naples. When she was performing there in 1902, she contacted Camorra boss Enrico Alfano to ask for help in returning some of her missing jewelry. Within a few days, Alfano tracked down the thieves and restored the jewelry. The case made headlines and Alfano was arrested for complicity in the crime, but was acquitted. The Italian comical actor Nicola Maldacea, with whom she sang duets, remembered her as:

Better than beautiful, very attractive. Deep, lively, black eyes, enchanting smile, beautiful mouth, perhaps a little wide, but showing off a superb set of teeth; shiny black hair; of normal stature, but her nimble body is perfect in form. Highly intelligent, with a quick and lively wit, she sings in French, Spanish, English and Italian. She wears eccentric, knee-length dresses on stage, with fashionable rhinestones and sequins, sparkling with silky lace. Her very spicy and seductive clothing is made by the best Parisian tailors, and is exclusive, based on designs by Eugénie Fougère...

She toured frequently in the British music halls in London, making her first appearance in 1893 at the Empire Theatre of Varieties on Leicester Square in London's West End. In 1896, she made her debut in Germany and Austria at the Apollo-Theater (de) in Berlin and the Etablissement Ronacher in Vienna. Other countries include Spain and Cuba. In 1887, at the age of 17, she first performed at the Edén Concert (es) in Barcelona along with her older sister Juliette. Years later she made her debut in Madrid. She first toured Mexico in 1911, performing at the Teatro Mexicano in Mexico City and Veracruz in 1913. While performing in Mexico City in 1914, she almost perished when her carriage's horses bolted and the carriage collided with a lamppost.

Fougère had many real or supposed romances that were widely reported in the media at the time, including with the American professional boxer James J. Jeffries (who denied ever having met her) and the Italian comic actor Vincenzo Scarpetta (it), scion of a famous Neapolitan theatre family, whose father Eduardo Scarpetta only barely prevented him from going to Paris with Fougère. In May 1906, Fougère and her husband, the actor Albert Girault (Note: Albert Girault, husband of Eugenie Fougere, died 4 April 1912 at Calle de Berlin, Mexico City, of a typhoid attack.) (also spelled Girod), were convicted of shoplifting a night dress, lingerie, and other items one particular night after leaving a London-based textile company, Lewis & Alleby's. She was performing at the Oxford Music Hall for a substantial salary (US$400 a week equivalent to $14,333 in 2025) and claimed she had forgotten to pay. The charges, widely reported in the newspapers, were dismissed on appeal. She had a reputation for spending money fast.

In 1909, she made an appearance in Montreal that shocked and scandalized the audience because of the routines in her performance and the "excessive display of lingerie". A Montreal Gazette article the next day mentioned that, "Mademoiselle Eugenie Fougère, the French music hall actress, who was announced to appear at Bennett's as headliner during this week, made her first and last appearance at that theatre yesterday afternoon. Although such acts as she presented might be quite acceptable in the music halls of London and Paris, they certainly should have no place in the bill of any Montreal theatre." The manager of the theatre told Eugénie that she would not be allowed to appear again.

== Later life ==
During World War I, she performed with a music hall and café-concert troupe in Spain called Los Aliados (The Allies) and in Havana (Cuba), where she sang for the French Red Cross. According to Gordon she shortly returned to stage in 1920 "after a long hiatus," in the Ambassadeurs alongside the French dancer and actress Polaire. That year, she is said to have introduced the rumba in France with the Cuban dancer Enrique Ruíz Madrid at a World Championship in Modern Dancing, organised by the literary and artistic paper Comœdia, after a long stay in Cuba. In 1926, they lived together at 32 Avenue des Ternes in the 17th arrondissement of Paris.

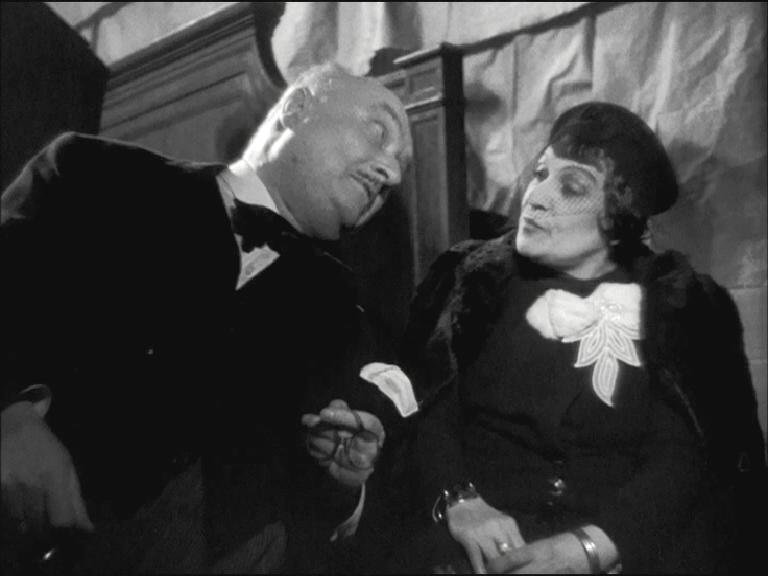
Pierre Juvenet and Eugenie Fougère in The Pearls of the Crown

In an interview with Maurice Hamel (fr) for Comœdia in 1925 she complained she had no engagements anymore and about her lost fortune; jewelry worth FF 275,000 had been stolen from her. In 1928 she had a modest comeback in La Scala as "the unforgettable creator of the gommeuse genre" (although the genre had long since fallen into disuse). In a retrospective in 1934, Hamel recalled her small apartment in Paris in which the walls were covered with photographs, as if she had created her own museum, in which she reminisced about her rich career. She said she had had many difficulties to correct the false notice of her death in 1903 when she was confused with her namesake.

In 1936, she lived alone at 64 rue de Lévis in the 17th arrondissement. In 1937 she played a vieille coquette in the film The Pearls of the Crown (French: Les Perles de la couronne) directed by Sacha Guitry. On 16 September 1939, two weeks after France's declaration of war on Germany at the start of World War II, her name appeared on a list of artists who volunteered to perform on stage for the benefit of other needy artists. She was not heard from again after that date.

While residing at 5 rue du Mont-Dore in the 17th arrondissement, she died at the age of 75 under the name Eugénie Fougère on 6 February 1946 at the Salpêtrière hospital and was buried a week later in the Parisian cemetery of Thiais (14th division).

== Legacy ==
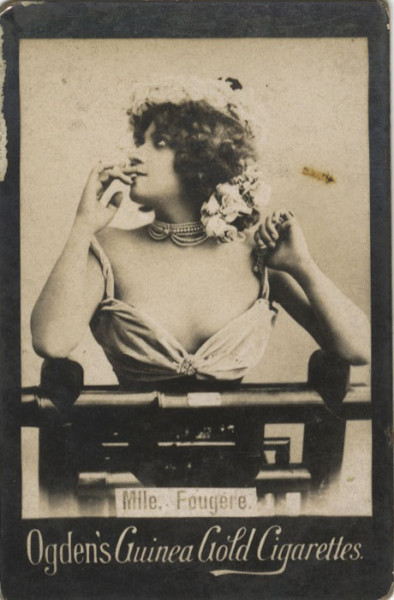
Eugénie Fougère on a cigarette trading card published by Ogdens for Ogden's Guinea Gold Tobacco. Published between 1899 and 1907.

Fougère was also an early example of a pin-up model; she appeared on many postcards and on a cigarette card, advertising for the cigarette brand Ogden's Guinea Gold Cigarettes. In 1900, the American painter Louis Kronberg made a portrait of Fougère (Dancer With Tambourine). The Italian actress and singer Anna Fougez adopted her stage name as a tribute to Fougère.

Gordon notes that the popularity of performers like Fougère "was comparable to that of Elvis Presley a little more than half a century later." She was the inspiration for several noted dancers, actresses, and singers of the time to incorporate the "negro" and African style of dancing she used in their routines and shows. She was also one of the pioneer burlesque music hall and theatre performers. According to Hamel she was "a precursor who introduced the repertoire of foreign songs and dances from every country into the café-concert well before this repertoire became fashionable".

After the erroneous news of her being murdered in 1903, which also made the front pages of newspapers in the U.S., a somewhat premature obituary said that "many of her songs were insults to people of refinement, but they were clever and sparkling, and her ability to express charmingly shades of more than doubtful meaning was unquestioned."

Fougère was included in a mural in the rooftop bar of the Knickerbocker Hotel at Times Square in New York City, when it re-opened in 2015, to commemorate the time the hotel was the hottest spot in town in the early 1900s. Ironically, in 1907 she had been kicked out of the hotel because she shared a room with her male manager - although they were married, as became clear later.

She was mentioned by name in the classic Frank Wedekind tragedy Erdgeist (Earth Spirit). During act I, the character Lulu stated in response to a question about her dancing, "I learned in Paris. I took lessons from Eugenie Fougère. She let me copy her costumes too." From a letter written by the playwright, one might infer that he had met Fougère personally. In a letter in 1899, he wrote: "On the first evening of my stay here, I was in Folies Bergêre, saw Eugenie Fougère, a little wild, but didn't take the opportunity to renew our acquaintance." He also referred to her in an interview with the Spanish vaudeville dancer La Tortajada for the German satirical weekly magazine Simplicissimus saying that "she was the best dancer I had seen so far in her genre."

The singer, entertainer and theatre entrepreneur, Paulus remembered her in his memoirs as "the wild and whimsical performer whose daring captivated the audience, and whose disquieting grace excused her eccentricities."

== Sources ==
- (in French) Bossy, Anne-Marie (2007). Les Grandes Affaires Criminelles de Savoie, Romagnat: Editions de Borée, ISBN 978-2-84494-503-7
- (in French) Caradec, François & Alain Weill (1980). Le café-concert, Paris: Hachette/Massin ISBN 2-01-006940-4
- Gilbert, Douglas (1942). Lost Chords, The Diverting Story of American Popular Songs, Garden City, N.Y.: Doubleday, Doran and Co., Inc. ISBN 978-0-8154-0370-8
- Gordon, Rae Beth (2001). Why the French Love Jerry Lewis: From Cabaret to Early Cinema, Stanford (CA): Stanford University Press, ISBN 978-0-8047-3894-1
- Gordon, Rae Beth (2009). Dances With Darwin, 1875-1910: Vernacular Modernity in France, Farnham: Ashgate Publishing, ISBN 978-0-7546-5243-4
- Moore Whiting, Steven (1999). Satie the Bohemian: From Cabaret to Concert Hall, Oxford: Oxford University Press, ISBN 0-19-816458-0
- (in Italian) Paliotti, Vittorio (2006). Storia della Camorra, Rome: Newton Compton editore, ISBN 88-541-0713-1
- (in Italian) Paliotti, Vittorio (2001). Salone Margherita: una storia napoletana; il primo café chantant d'Italia. Naples: Altrastampa
- (in French) Pénet, Martin (1995). Mistinguett: la reine du music-hall, Monaco: Editions du Rocher, ISBN 2-268-02170-X
- (in French) Pradels, Octave (1907). Paulus: Trente ans de Café-concert, Paris: Societe d'edition et de publications
- Tomars, Adolph S. (2020). The First Oscar Hammerstein and New York's Golden Age of Theater and Music, Jefferson: McFarland ISBN 978-0-7864-9615-0
