= Fougere =

Fougere may refer to:

- Fougère, one of the main olfactive families of perfumes
- Fougeré, Maine-et-Loire, a former commune in France
- Fougeré, Vendée, a commune in France
- Michael Fougere (born 1956), Canadian politician
- Vernon Fougère (1943–2013), Canadian bishop
- Eugénie Fougère (1870 – unknown), French vaudeville and music hall singer
- Eugénie Fougère (demimondaine) (1861–1903), French frequenter of the demi-monde

== See also ==
- Fougères, in Brittany, France
