= Hannah Taylor-Gordon =

British actress

- Born: 6 March 1987 (age 39); London, England
- Education: Lee Strasberg Theatre and Film Institute; London Academy of Music and Dramatic Art
- Occupation: Actress
- Years active: 1991–2014

Hannah Taylor-Gordon (born 6 March 1987) is an English retired actress. She made her film debut in the 1993 film The House of the Spirits. She is best known for her role as Anne Frank in the TV miniseries Anne Frank: The Whole Story for which she received both an Emmy and a Golden Globe nomination.

In 2012 she played Lady Macbeth in a film version of The Tragedy of Macbeth.

== Career ==
Taylor-Gordon has been acting since she was four. Her first acting role was on the British television series Casualty. Her first film role was in the 1993 film The House of the Spirits, where she played young Blanca Trueba. She played small roles in the film Four Weddings and a Funeral and Mary Shelley's Frankenstein.

Taylor-Gordon is probably best known for playing Anne Frank in the 2001 ABC television film Anne Frank: The Whole Story, which earned her nominations for both a Golden Globe and an Emmy Award. The miniseries co-starred Ben Kingsley, Brenda Blethyn, and Lili Taylor.

Taylor-Gordon starred as Lina in the 1999 film Jakob the Liar, which co-starred Robin Williams. She played a Holocaust victim in both this film and Anne Frank: The Whole Story. In the 2004 film Secret Passage, Taylor-Gordon played a supporting role alongside John Turturro.

In 2005, Taylor-Gordon acted in the film The Fine Art of Love. She played Irene, starring alongside Natalia Tena, Mary Nighy and Jacqueline Bisset.

In 2012, Taylor-Gordon played Lady Macbeth in the film The Tragedy of Macbeth, that would eventually win awards for Best Film, Best Actor, and Best Director at the Indie Film Festival.

She also played Stella in BBC Radio 4's production The Cazalets: Marking Time until August 2013.

== Personal life ==
Hannah Taylor Gordon was born in London. She is the daughter of Andrew, an entrepreneur, and Clare Gordon, a homemaker. She studied Art History and Italian at University College London and trained at the New York City method acting school Lee Strasberg Theatre and Film Institute in 2008. She graduated in 2012 from LAMDA and now lives in Los Angeles and London.

== Filmography ==
=== As actress ===
| Title | Year | Role | Notes |
|---|---|---|---|
| The House of the Spirits | 1993 | Young Blanca Trueba | |
| Don't Get Me Started | 1994 | Cricket | Uncredited |
| Four Weddings and a Funeral | 1994 | Young Bridesmaid – Wedding Two | |
| Mary Shelley's Frankenstein | 1994 | Young Elizabeth | |
| Saint-Ex | 1996 | Young Gabrielle | |
| Passion's Way | 1999 | Effie Leath | Alternately titled The Reef |
| Mansfield Park | 1999 | Young Fanny | |
| Jakob the Liar | 1999 | Lina Kronstein | |
| Anne Frank: The Whole Story | 2001 | Anne Frank | Main Role |
| Secret Passage | 2004 | Victoria | |
| Vipere Au Poing | 2004 | Fine | |
| The Fine Art of Love: Mine Ha-Ha | 2005 | Irene | |
| The Tragedy of Macbeth | 2012 | Lady Macbeth | |
| Jack Ryan: Shadow Recruit | 2014 | Sarah | |

=== As casting director ===
Tiny Ruins: Carriages (video short) (post-production)

== Television ==
| Title | Year | Role | Notes |
|---|---|---|---|
| Casualty | 1991 | Unknown | TV series |
| Against All Odds: Lost and Found | 1994 | Pam, as a child | TV series |
| Buffalo Girls | 1995 | Janey | |
| Anne Frank: The Whole Story | 2001 | Anne Frank | Nominated – AFI TV Award for AFI Actor of the Year – Female – Movie or Mini-Series; Nominated – Golden Globe Award for Best Actress – Miniseries or Television Film; Nominated – Primetime Emmy Award for Outstanding Lead Actress in a Miniseries or a Movie; Nominated – Satellite Award for Best Actress – Miniseries or Television Film |
| The Ten Commandments | 2006 | Rachel | |
| Frankenstein and the Vampyre:a Dark and Stormy Night | 2014 | Mary Shelley | |
