= Star Theatre (film) =

- the full film
- Directed by: F.S. Armitage
- Produced by: American Mutoscope and Biograph Company
- Cinematography: F.S. Armitage
- Release date: 1901
- Running time: 1 minute, 58 seconds
- Country: United States
- Language: Silent film

Star Theatre (also known as Demolishing and Building Up the Star Theatre) is a 1901 short documentary film in which time-lapse photography is used to show the dismantling and demolition of New York City's Star Theatre over a period of about a month.

Produced by the American Mutoscope and Biograph Company (often shortened to Biograph), it was filmed by F.S. Armitage. In 2002, the film was deemed "culturally, historically, or aesthetically significant" by the United States Library of Congress, and selected for preservation in its National Film Registry.

== Production ==
Formerly called Wallack's Theatre, the Star Theatre was located across the street from Biograph's offices on Thirteenth Street and Broadway in New York City, New York. Taking advantage of his view from his office, Armitage set up a camera and used "a specifically devised electric apparatus" to shoot every four minutes, eight hours a day. He also shot about thirty seconds of standard exposures at the beginning and end of the demolition process to set and close the scene.

Biograph publicists encouraged exhibitors to show the film advancing regularly and in reverse, adding "The effect is very extraordinary."
