= Chimmie Hicks at the Races =

1900 American short film directed by Frederick S. Armitage

Above the Limit (Chimmie Hicks at the Races)
- Directed by: Frederick S. Armitage
- Starring: Charley Grapewin
- Production company: American Mutoscope
- Distributed by: American Mutoscope & Biograph
- Release date: November 1900
- Country: United States

Above the Limit (United States copyright 1902 as Chimmie Hicks at the Races) is a short film made in November 1900 by Frederick S. Armitage. It marks the film debut of vaudevillian actor Charley Grapewin, 39 years before his better-remembered role as Dorothy's Uncle Henry in MGM's The Wizard of Oz. Created by the American Mutoscope and Biograph Company along with its sister film, Grapewin's Chimmie Hicks and the Rum Omelet, it was shot in September and October 1900 and released in November of that year for viewing in Mutoscope "Moving Picture Machines" (a format with better viewing quality than the Edison Kinetoscope) as a tale sharing the pitfalls of gambling.

== Plot ==
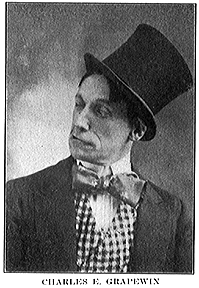
Charles E. Grapewin as Chimmie Hicks

The film is a silent character sketch that shows Chimmie Hicks (Charles E. Grapewin) imitating a man at the races winning and losing. Filmed on a bare stage with a dark backdrop, the sketch captures Chimmie in a three-piece suit and overcoat holding a racing program while watching a race taking place offstage. It shows him excitedly jumping and pantomiming that his horse has won the race. A second man enters the frame and gives Chimmie his winnings. Chimmie returns a sum of money to the booker to place another bet. The next race begins and Chimmie again shows great excitement, which quickly turns to despair and anger as the horse loses. The bookie returns, collects all of Chimmie's money and his watch. The gambler falls to his knees, shakes his arms toward the sky, and tears up his racing form, scattering the pieces on the ground. He rises and sadly begins to leave the stage.

== See also ==
- List of films about horses
- List of films about horse racing
