= Innocence (2004 film) =

2004 film by Lucile Hadžihalilović

- French theatrical release poster
- Directed by: Lucile Hadžihalilović
- Screenplay by: Lucile Hadžihalilović
- Based on: Mine-Haha, or On the Bodily Education of Young Girls by Frank Wedekind
- Produced by: Patrick Sobelman
- Starring: Marion Cotillard; Hélène de Fougerolles; Zoé Auclair; Lea Bridaroslli; Bérangère Haubruge; Alison Lalieux; Olga Peytavi-Müller
- Cinematography: Benoît Debie
- Edited by: Adam Finch
- Music by: Richard Cooke
- Production companies: Ex Nihilo; UK Film Council; Les Ateliers de Baere; Blue Light; Love Streams Productions; Gimages Films
- Distributed by: Mars Distribution (France); Artificial Eye (United Kingdom); Paradiso Entertainment (Belgium)
- Release dates: 10 September 2004 (TIFF); 12 January 2005 (France); 31 August 2005 (Belgium); 30 September 2005 (United Kingdom)
- Running time: 120 minutes
- Countries: France; United Kingdom; Belgium
- Language: French

Innocence (French: [i.nɔ.sɑ̃s]) is a 2004 French avant-garde coming-of-age psychological drama film written and directed by Lucile Hadžihalilović in her feature directorial debut, inspired by the 1903 novella Mine-Haha, or On the Bodily Education of Young Girls by Frank Wedekind, and starring Marion Cotillard. The film follows a year in the life of the girls in the third dormitory at a secluded boarding school, where new students arrive in coffins.

The film is a co-production between France, United Kingdom and Belgium and made its world premiere at the Toronto International Film Festival on 10 September 2004. It was released theatrically in France on 12 January 2005, in Belgium on 31 August 2005 and in the United Kingdom on 30 September 2005.

== Plot ==
Six-year-old Iris arrives inside a coffin placed in a dormitory's common area, where she is met with general warmth and curiosity by the other six girls who live in the house. After dressing her in a uniform matching theirs, the girls all exchange hair ribbons: each girl gets the ribbons passed down from the girl a year above her, and the colour marks their age and year in the school. Iris, the new youngest "red ribbon", unfortunately excites the ire of seven-year-old Selma, the former red ribbon and now orange ribbon, who complains about the absence of the former violet-ribbon Natashka—the oldest who had been her friend. The new violet ribbon, twelve-year-old Bianca, takes Iris under her wing. At first Iris is homesick, and wants to be reunited with her brother, but Bianca matter-of-factly tells her there is no possibility of that: there are no boys allowed in the school. All of the girls go swimming in the lake, and Iris quickly befriends Laura, the red-ribbon of another house. That night, much to Iris's dismay, Bianca leaves on an authorized mysterious errand that she cannot discuss. The next day, Iris has a routine day at the school – dance lessons, classroom time with animals, and recreation. The classes at the school are run by two pretty young women: Mademoiselle Edith, who walks with a cane and teaches lessons, and Mademoiselle Eva, who teaches dance. Each house is cared for by an elderly serving woman; the girls whisper that all of the employees are girls who tried to escape the walled school in their youth, and were pressed into permanent service as punishment.

One night, Iris follows Bianca on her secret errand, but she loses track of the older girl once she reaches the main building. She explores, but only stumbles across more she does not understand: a shadowy man preparing an injection for a shadowy woman (possibly the elderly servant.) She flees, and is lost in the woods for the night. After a period of smouldering animosity, Selma makes overtures to befriend Iris, but then beats her with a switch (stem) when Iris asks about Bianca's nightly departures. Selma also uses her fingertip, touching Iris's wound, to gingerly taste Iris's blood. As time passes, Laura, unlike Iris, is morose and unable to adapt to life at the school. With Iris's help – and a pledge of secrecy – she steals a rowboat in an attempt to escape, but drowns when the boat starts to leak and the weather turns sour. A distressed Iris tells Bianca what Laura has done. The school holds a funeral, where Laura's coffin is burned on a pyre.

As winter arrives, the focus shifts to the ten-year-old Alice, the fifth-year blue ribbon, who is hungry to leave the school and see the world outside. She has placed her hopes on winning the annual inspection of the blue ribbons, where the mysterious headmistress arrives from afar and, after watching them dance, chooses one girl from the class to leave the school early with her for an unknown reason. Though Edith cautions that she shouldn't get her hopes up, Alice has been anticipating this moment – and her own winning of the honour of leaving. Though the competition is close, another girl is chosen instead. Hysterical, Alice collapses at the headmistress's feet. She convalesces, but isn't the same as before: she doesn't speak, and aimlessly and perpetually stares into space. Finally, she runs out into the woods surrounding the school buildings, and climbs over the stone wall that surrounds the school. As we see her flee into the snowy woods beyond, camouflaged by her white uniform, we hear the sound of distant gunshots and barking dogs. Later, as Eva looks pensively out a window, Edith informs her that Alice cannot be found; she then informs the other girls that Alice has been very bad, and will not be seen or spoken of again.

After Alice's escape (and possible death), the focus turns to Bianca. The violet ribbons are told about the bodily changes that they will soon experience, and Bianca grows pensive. For the first time, she brings Nadja, the indigo-ribbon girl a year her junior, along on her nighttime trip. Together, they go to the main school building, and enter a secret passage behind the grandfather clock. There, the girls get into butterfly costumes, and prepare: each night they put on a dance recital for a mysterious audience. The next night, Nadja falters, but a man in the audience calls out to Bianca, telling her she is the most beautiful, and throws her a rose. After the show, Bianca and another girl explore the empty theater. They find an abandoned men's theatre glove, and encounter one of the servants counting the performance's receipts—this, the girls are informed, is how the school makes its money. Bianca keeps the rose and the glove as a treasure, and fantasizes about the glove's touch, but ultimately casts them both into the water of the lake. Iris and Bianca spend the morning together on what Bianca explains will be her last day at the school. After a formal, tearful goodbye, she passes off her duties to Nadja. Bianca and the other violet ribbons put their ribbons in a box, and accompany Eva and Edith further down the hallway behind the clock than they've ever been before. There, they board a subway train, and leave the school. Eva smokes a cigarette. Back at the house, a new girl emerges from her coffin, to be greeted by Iris, Selma, and the others. The train arrives at a grand, modern plaza, and Eva and Edith leave the girls. Bianca and the other girls immediately begin playing in the fountains nearby. A group of nearby teenage boys lose their ball in the fountain, and one wades in after it. Though he is obscured by the fountain's display, he fascinates Bianca. She playfully splashes water at him, and he splashes back. The film ends as it began, with a shot of rushing water.

== Cast ==
- Zoé Auclair as Iris
- Bérangère Haubruge as Bianca
- Lea Bridaroslli as Alice
- Marion Cotillard as Mademoiselle Eva
- Hélène de Fougerolles as Mademoiselle Edith
- Alison Lalieux as Selma
- Astrid Homme as Rose
- Ana Palomo-Diaz as Nadja
- Olga Peytavi-Müller as Laura
- Joséphine Van Wambeke as Vera
- Corinne Marchand as headmistress
- Sonia Petrovna as assistant

== Production ==
The film was produced by Love Streams Productions. Like their previous co-production I Stand Alone it was partially financed by agnès b.

== Themes ==
In the 'extras' on the DVD release, the director relates that children playing unsupervised in nature (the forest, the pond) is a 'freeing' setting for them, an 'uncontrolled' environment to explore. Water is very important, as it is a highly visible medium in its many forms (including within or from underneath a surface), and it is necessary, sensual, and enjoyable, but also dangerous (the drowning), and evokes many emotions. Flowing water can also symbolize the passage of time. The dynamic of children relating to adults, not understating them or their actions, while seeing them as role models, is another dichotomy the director wanted to emphasize. Ambiguity and a 'dream-like' quality are also important elements of the film. She states they digitally enhanced or 'tweaked' colors in the film to 'non-realistic' tones, to achieve mood and lighting effect, particularly day for night shots. The director says she is not interested in explaining meaning: "... what I like in cinema is being lost. I like films I don't completely understand, so they stay with me longer after they're over," and, "I believe everyone can find their own stories within the film."

== Reception ==
On the review aggregator website Rotten Tomatoes, the film holds an approval rating of 71% based on 21 reviews, with an average rating of 6.8/10. The website's consensus reads, "Beautiful, inscrutable, and overall unsettling, Innocence may leave viewers wondering what they've just seen, but it'll certainly be difficult to forget." Metacritic, which uses a weighted average, assigned the film a score of 78 out of 100, based on 13 critics, indicating "generally favorable reviews". AlloCiné, a French cinema site, gave the film an average rating of 3.5/5, based on a survey of 26 French reviews.

== See also ==
- The Fine Art of Love, a 2005 Italian film adaptation of Wedekind's novella
