= Secret Passage =

2004 film by Ademir Kenović and Olivier Bonas

- Directed by: Ademir Kenović
- Written by: Ademir Kenović; Olivier Bonas
- Starring: John Turturro; Katherine Borowitz; Hannah Taylor-Gordon; Tara Fitzgerald
- Cinematography: Vilko Filač
- Edited by: Robin Sales
- Music by: Stephen Warbeck
- Release date: 2004
- Countries: Italy, Portugal, Luxembourg
- Language: English

Secret Passage is a 2004 film directed by Ademir Kenović. It was written by Kenović and Olivier Bonas. The film stars John Turturro, Katherine Borowitz, Tara Fitzgerald, and Hannah Taylor-Gordon. In the United Kingdom, the film is mostly known as The Lion's Mouth.

== Plot ==
The film starts in 1492, in Spain. Jews are being chased everywhere. They have two choices: either to convert or to face trial and execution. Isabel (Katherine Borowitz), and Clara (Tara Fitzgerald) are growing up with terror. Although forcibly baptized, the sisters are chased through Christendom until they arrive in Venice. In Venice, Isabel organizes a secret passage in order to give refuge to the refugees who were fleeing away in the fear of the Inquisition. Isabel decides that, in order to be safe, her family must flee to Istanbul, the only place where Jews are not hated. But Clara refuses to leave, because she is in love with a Venetian named Paolo Zane (John Turturro). When Isabel somewhat tries to force Clara to move to Istanbul, Clara gets furious at the former and is almost ready to break all family ties with Isabel. In these battles of misunderstandings, Clara's young daughter Victoria (Hannah Taylor-Gordon) is trapped, who finds that she is about to be married into the same faith that murdered her own father.

== Cast ==
- John Turturro as Paolo Zane
- Tara Fitzgerald as Clara
- Katherine Borowitz as Isabel
- Anton Rodgers as Foscari
- Hannah Taylor-Gordon as Victoria
- Ronald Pickup as Da Monte
- Richard Harrington as Joseph
- Seymour Matthews as Ruben
- Marc Pickering as Andrea Zane
- Carmen Sorrenti as Francesca
- Adam Kotz as Inquisitor
- Alassandra Costanzo as Donna Benveniste
