= Against All Odds: Lost and Found =

- Written by: Kate Wood
- Directed by: Kim Flitcroft
- Starring: Hannah Taylor-Gordon

Production
- Producer: British Broadcasting Corporation

Original release
- Release: 8 November 1994

Against All Odds: Lost and Found is a television film which aired on 8 November 1994. It was produced by the British Broadcasting Corporation. The movie was directed by Kim Flitcroft, written by Kate Wood, and it starred Hannah Taylor-Gordon.
