= Mine-Haha, or On the Bodily Education of Young Girls =

1903 novella by Frank Wedekind

Mine-Haha, or On the Bodily Education of Young Girls (German: Mine-Haha oder Über die körperliche Erziehung der jungen Mädchen) is a novella by German dramatist Frank Wedekind, first published in its final form in 1903.

== Plot ==
The novella purports to be an autobiographical manuscript handed to the editor by an 84-year-old retired teacher, Helene Engel, shortly before she committed suicide. The "manuscript" itself describes the bizarre education and socialisation of a young girl, Hidalla, in two boarding establishments, the first co-educational, the second all-female. At the age of seven Hidalla is placed in a coffin-like crate and transferred to the "park", a location that is both idyllic and hermetically sealed by high walls, where she spends the next seven years, learning only gymnastics, dance and music. The regime is rigidly hierarchical, with the older girls supervising and teaching the younger ones, the aim being to learn to "think with the hips". Transgression is severely punished. The "park" is financed by the takings from a theatre, where the girls must perform nightly in "pantomimes" of an adult nature they do not understand. At one point a delegation of "ladies" arrive to select the girls for unspecified tasks, but Hidalla is not chosen. With the onset of menstruation, Hidalla and her peers are required to take an underground train to the outside world where they are united with boys of their own age. At this juncture the "manuscript" breaks off.

== Reception ==
The critic Elizabeth Boa has suggested that the story can be read in at least three ways. In the first, the children inhabit a utopia, an alternative childhood, where "a bodily culture of the senses is set against the mind as the source of illusion". The second reading is dystopian: a "nightmare world of rigid control" enforced by the children themselves. The third way is to view it as a "grotesque satire of the way in which girls are actually brought up". The English translator of Mine-Haha, Philip Ward, points to Wedekind’s equivocal attitude towards the feminist movement of his day, his taste for voyeurism and biological essentialism conflicting with his radical ideas on education and marriage: "we applaud Wedekind’s insight, while perhaps fretting about his motivation in arriving at it". The work was praised, with reservations, by Leon Trotsky. Theodor W. Adorno placed it, alongside Edgar Allan Poe's Pym, among the "greatest works" of "fantastic art". More recently, the singer Marianne Faithfull has described it as "a fairy tale that morphs into something far more grotesque – a psycho-sexual Expressionist fable".

The title Mine-Haha is a Germanised form of "Minnehaha", the name of Hiawatha’s lover in The Song of Hiawatha by Henry Wadsworth Longfellow.

== Film adaptations ==
- Innocence (2004) - directed by Lucile Hadžihalilović
- The Fine Art of Love (2005) - directed by John Irvin

== Works cited ==
- Adorno, Theodor W. 1997. Aesthetic Theory, trans Robert Hullot-Kentor. London: Athlone. ISBN 0-485-30069-9.
- Boa, Elizabeth. 1987. The Sexual Circus: Wedekind's Theatre of Subversion. Oxford and New York: Basil Blackwell. ISBN 0-631-14234-7.
- Faithfull, Marianne. 2008. Memories, Dreams and Reflections. London and New York: Harper Perennial. ISBN 0-00-724581-5.
- Ward, Philip. 2010. "Introduction". In: Frank Wedekind, Mine-Haha, or on the Bodily Education of Young Girls. London: Hesperus Books. ISBN 1-84391-455-7.
