= A Nymph of the Waves =

1900 film by Frederick S. Armitage

- Directed by: Frederick S. Armitage
- Produced by: Frederick S. Armitage
- Starring: Catarina Bartho
- Production company: American Mutoscope and Biograph Company
- Release date: 1900
- Country: United States
- Language: Silent

A Nymph of the Waves is a silent, short film produced in the year 1900 by Frederick S. Armitage for American Mutoscope and Biograph Company. Armitage's main claim to fame is film direction; but this is one of the few films he is known to have worked on as a producer.

== Synopsis ==
True to its title, the one-minute film shows a young woman dancing on the waves. The nymph in question is played by Catarina Bartho, a well-known dancer of the time. Though, whatever water can be seen in the preserved film are the roiling waves behind her. Donning a flowing white dress, she performs a mix of dance genres, with ballet kicks and twirls. While she moves as if dancing on water, it is easy to see today that the dance is superimposed on another video of moving water.
