= Franziska (play) =

Franziska is a play by the German dramatist Frank Wedekind, first produced in 1912. Subtitled "a modern Mystery in five acts", it presents the heroine as a "female Faust" by way of conscious parody and commentary on episodes from Goethe's Faust.

== Plot ==
Franziska is a restless young woman, bored with living with her mother. Having observed her parents' married life, she wants no part of marriage. A knock at the window announces the arrival of Veit Kunz, an insurance agent from Berlin, who offers her a bargain. Disguised as a man, she will have two years to enjoy the freedoms of a man and fulfill her ambitions as a musician, at the end of which she will belong to Kunz. There follows a wild nightclub scene set in "Clara's Place" among a debauched assembly of writers and prostitutes, which gives full rein to Wedekind's verbal inventiveness. "Franz", as Franziska now styles herself, is by now unhappily "married" to Sophie, a young heiress who is unaware of her true identity. Meanwhile, she has become Kunz's lover and fallen pregnant by him. Sophie's brother learns that his sister has married a woman and wishes to avenge her lost honor, but when Sophie is told of the truth she shoots herself. Kunz now marries Franziska and starts a new career as a writer of "mysteries", in which his wife acts. One of these depicts Christ's descent into hell to free the souls of pagan heroes, with Franziska cast as Helen of Troy. Another play-within-the-play is a doggerel composition in rhymed couplets written by their patron the Duke of Rotenburg. The couple's marital bliss proves short-lived, however, as Franziska begins an affair with the actor Ralf Breitenbach. On discovering this, Kunz makes a botched suicide attempt. In the final Act Franziska finds contentment in rustic surroundings with the painter Karl Almer and her young son Veitralf (named after her two former lovers). When Kunz and Breitenbach visit her in this idyll, she wants nothing from either of them, having learned to live within her own limitations.

== Relationship to Goethe's Faust ==
Throughout the text, Wedekind plays off parallels and contrasts with Goethe's Faust, providing German audiences with "irreverent, but affectionate, parody of their national poet." Thus Franziska is Faust to Veit Kunz's Mephistopheles; like Faust, she is actuated by a thirst for "knowledge". Clara's Place corresponds to the "Auerbach's Cellar" episode in Faust I. The character of Sophie recalls the innocent Gretchen, whom Goethe's Faust seduces and impregnates. The dukedom of Rotenburg is the Emperor's court in Faust II, with Kunz's "mystery" plays parodying the "Classical Walpurgisnacht" of Goethe's play. The conciliatory final scene has been read as "an exaltation of maternal womanhood as a parallel to Goethe's apotheosis of the active male spirit". However, one recent critic argues that readings of the play in relation to the Faust legend have been overdone and it would be "more fruitful to regard Franziska as a critical elaboration of predominant gender norms of the Wilhelmine era".

== Productions ==
Franziska was first performed at the Kammerspiele, Munich, in November 1912, with Wedekind's wife Tilly in the title role and Wedekind himself as Veit Kunz. The director was Eugen Robert. The play was mounted again in Berlin a year later, with the same principals, in a production by Max Reinhardt. It has rarely been seen on German stages since the 1930s. However, international interest was revived by Stéphane Braunschweig's French-language production in 1995. This in turn led to the play's English-language premiere at the Gate Theatre (London) in 1998, directed by Georgina Van Welie. There was a German revival in 2000 at the Schauspielhaus Hanover, directed by Christina Paulhofer: in this adaptation by Thea Dorn, the title character (played by Isabella Parkinson) ended the play as a pop star. In 2012 a centenary production opened at the Kammerspiele, Munich, directed by Andreas Kriegenburg, with Brigitte Hobmeier in the title role.

In July 1912 the composer Ferruccio Busoni had been asked by Wedekind via Karl Vollmoeller whether he would be willing to provide incidental music for Franziska. Busoni considered the proposition, which would have involved composing twelve numbers to be played between the acts, and went as far as preparing a plan for the music and orchestration, of which three sketches (cat. no. BV 260) survive. His own plans already included a Faust project, and he eventually declined the proposal, writing to his wife on 24 July: "It will spoil my own Faust idea for myself." Busoni's "own Faust idea" ultimately became his unfinished opera Doktor Faust (1924).

== Sources ==
- Beaumont, Antony (1985). Busoni the Composer. London: Faber and Faber. ISBN 0-571-13149-2.
- Couling, Della (2005). Ferruccio Busoni: A musical Ishmael. Lanham, MD: Scarecrow Press. ISBN 978-0-8108-5142-9.
- Kindermann, Jürgen (1980). Thematisch-chronologisches Verzeichnis der Werke von Ferruccio B. Busoni. Studien zur Musikgeschichte des 19. Jahrhunderts, vol. 19. Regensburg: Gustav Bosse Verlag. ISBN 978-3-7649-2033-3.
- Ley, Rosamond, editor and translator (1938). Ferruccio Busoni: Letters to His Wife. London: Edward Arnold & Co. (1975 reprint: New York: Da Capo Press. ISBN 978-0-306-70732-2.)
- Munich Kammerpiele programme 2012 (in German).
- Navratil, Michael (2013). "Ich wollte meine Unschuld endlich loswerden': the subversion of Wilhelmine gender norms in Frank Wedekind's Franziska". German Life and Letters. 66 (3): 277–291. doi:10.1111/glal.12016.
- Ward, Philip (1998). "Introduction". In: Frank Wedekind, Franziska, adapted by Eleanor Brown from a translation by Philip Ward. London: Oberon. ISBN 1-84002-082-2.
- Willeke, Audrone B (1980). "Frank Wedekind and the 'Frauenfrage'". Monatshefte. 72 (1): 26–38. JSTOR 30157020.
