= Earth Spirit (play) =

1895 play by Frank Wedekind

Earth Spirit (Erdgeist) (1895) is a play by the German dramatist Frank Wedekind. It forms the first part of his pairing of 'Lulu' plays; the second is Pandora's Box (1904), both depicting a society "riven by the demands of lust and greed". In German folklore an erdgeist is a gnome, first described in Goethe's Faust (1808). Together with Pandora's Box, Wedekind's play formed the basis for the silent film Pandora's Box (1929) starring Louise Brooks and the opera Lulu by Alban Berg (1935, premiered posthumously in 1937).

In the original manuscript, dating from 1894, the 'Lulu' drama was in five acts and subtitled 'A Monster Tragedy'. Wedekind subsequently divided the work into two plays: Earth Spirit (German: Erdgeist, first printed 1895) and Pandora's Box (German: Die Büchse der Pandora, first performed 1904). The premiere of Earth Spirit took place in Leipzig on 25 February 1898, in a production by Carl Heine, with Wedekind himself in the role of Dr Schön. Wedekind is known to have taken his inspiration from at least two sources: the circus pantomime Lulu, Une Clownesse danseuse by Félicien Champsaur, which he saw in Paris in the early 1890s, and the sex murders of Jack the Ripper in London in 1888. Although Lulu is not based on one specific, actually existing historical person (rather she is a composite and symbolic figure), the Lulu character may have been partially inspired by Lou Andreas-Salomé, whom Wedekind had met in Paris, but who had rejected his advances.

Lulu's character may also partly been based on the French vaudeville artist Eugénie Fougère. During act I, Lulu stated in response to a question about her dancing, "I learned in Paris. I took lessons from Eugenie Fougère. She let me copy her costumes too." Wedekind probably met Fougère (also known as Fou Fou) personally during his sojourns in Paris in 1892–1894, when he frequented the city's music halls and vaudeville theatres regularly. In a letter written by the playwright in 1899, Wedekind wrote: "On the first evening of my stay here, I was in Folies Bergêre, saw Eugenie Fougère, a little wild, but didn't take the opportunity to renew our acquaintance." He was impressed by the extravagant variety artist, and also referred to her in an interview with the Spanish vaudeville dancer La Tortajada for the German satirical weekly magazine Simplicissimus saying that "she was the best dancer I had seen so far in her genre."

== Plot ==
In a Prologue, the characters in the drama are introduced by an 'Animal Tamer' as if they are creatures in a travelling circus. Lulu herself is described as "the true animal, the wild, beautiful animal" and the "primal form of woman".

When the action of the play starts, Lulu has been rescued by the rich newspaper publisher Dr Schön from a life on the streets with her alleged father, the petty criminal Schigolch. Dr Schön has taken Lulu under his wing, educated her and made her his lover. Wishing however to make a more socially advantageous match for himself, he has married her off to the medic Dr Goll.

In the first Act Dr Goll has brought Lulu to have her portrait painted by Schwarz. Left alone with him, Lulu seduces the painter. When Dr Goll returns to confront them, he collapses with a fatal heart attack.

In Act Two, Lulu has married the painter Schwarz, who, with Schön's assistance, has now achieved fame and wealth. She remains Schön's mistress, however. Wishing to be rid of her ahead of his forthcoming marriage to a society belle, Charlotte von Zarnikow, Schön informs Schwarz about her dissolute past. Schwarz is shocked to the core and "guillotines" himself with his razor.

In Act Three Lulu appears as a dancer in a revue, her new career promoted by Schön's son Alwa, who is now also infatuated with her. Dr Schön is forced to admit that he is in her thrall. Lulu forces him to break off his engagement to Charlotte.

In Act Four Lulu is now married to Dr Schön but is unfaithful to him with several other people (Schigolch, Alwa, the circus artist Rodrigo Quast and the lesbian Countess Geschwitz). On discovering this, Schön presses a revolver into her hand, urging her to kill herself. Instead, she uses it to shoot Schön, all the while declaring him the only man she has ever loved. She is imprisoned for her crime.

Her escape from prison with the aid of Countess Geschwitz and subsequent career down to her death at the hands of Jack the Ripper in London are the subject of the sequel, Pandora's Box. It is now customary in theatre performances to run the two plays together, in abridged form, under the title Lulu.

== Reception ==
The play has attracted a wide range of interpretations, from those who see it as misogynistic to those who claim Wedekind as a harbinger of women's liberation. Central to these divergent readings is the ambiguous figure of Lulu herself. Arguably, she embodies not so much the "primal form of woman" (a nebulous and subjective concept) as perceptions – in particular, male perceptions – of that "primal form". It is significant that we never learn Lulu's true name, only the names imposed on her by a succession of lovers. To Schigolch she is "Lulu", an asexual name suggestive of children's earliest speech; significantly, Lulu is canonically only about 15 years of age when the drama begins. To Schön she is "Mignon", the name of the mysterious girl in Goethe's Wilhelm Meister's Apprenticeship who pursues the hero with submissive fidelity. To Schwarz she is Eve, mankind's first mother but also alleged agent (in the biblical narrative) of our undoing. Each man, secure in the patriarchal society to which she is a potential affront, finds in her what he wants to see; her own needs, meanwhile, remain obscured. A key stage prop throughout the play (and its sequel) is Schwarz's portrait of Lulu, which depicts her dressed as Pierrot. By further associating his heroine with this "naïve, comic, yet also pathetic" figure, Wedekind reminds audiences of her "essential vulnerability".

== Adaptations ==
The two Lulu plays were adapted for film and opera multiple times. The most well-known are Georg Wilhelm Pabst's silent film Pandora's Box (1929), starring Louise Brooks and Alban Berg's opera Lulu (1937). In 1923, Leopold Jessner had already adapted Earth Spirit for a German silent movie starring Asta Nielsen, and in 1980 Walerian Borowczyk adapted Earth Spirit for French television in 1980, starring Anne Bennant. An Italian version for television by director Mario Missiroli was made in 1980, starring Stefania Sandrelli. Also in 1980, Michael Feingold adapted the play into Lulu for the American Repertory Theater. In 2011, musicians Lou Reed and Metallica released Lulu, which was a collection of songs written by Reed based on the two Lulu plays. It is currently being adapted for comics by John Linton Roberson.
