= Alice, Darling =

2022 psychological drama film by Mary Nighy

- Theatrical release poster
- Directed by: Mary Nighy
- Written by: Alanna Francis
- Produced by: Katie Bird Nolan; Lindsay Tapscott; Christina Piovesan; Noah Segal; Sam Tipper-Hale
- Starring: Anna Kendrick; Kaniehtiio Horn; Charlie Carrick; Wunmi Mosaku
- Cinematography: Mike McLaughlin
- Edited by: Gareth C. Scales
- Music by: Owen Pallett
- Production companies: Babe Nation Films; Elevation Pictures; Ontario Creates; Castelletto Films
- Distributed by: Elevation Pictures (Canada); Lionsgate (International)
- Release dates: September 11, 2022 (TIFF); December 30, 2022 (United States)
- Running time: 89 minutes
- Countries: United States; Canada
- Language: English
- Box office: $165,264

Alice, Darling is a 2022 psychological thriller drama film directed by Mary Nighy, in her directorial debut, from a screenplay by Alanna Francis. The film stars Anna Kendrick, Kaniehtiio Horn, Charlie Carrick, and Wunmi Mosaku.

Alice, Darling had its world premiere at the Toronto International Film Festival on September 11, 2022, and was released in select cinemas on December 30, 2022, in Los Angeles at the AMC Sunset 5, before a wide release later in the United States on January 20, 2023, in AMC Theatres.

== Plot ==
Alice is in a psychologically abusive relationship with her boyfriend, Simon. After taking a vacation with friends, she decides to reassess her relationship with Simon and attempts to break her codependency.

Simon allows Alice out for a rare evening at a bar with her two best friends Tess and Sophie. The women notice that she is distracted and flinches at each ping from her phone, and throughout the evening she constantly touches her hair. It is implied that Alice met Simon in Tess's circle. However, despite Simon's connection to Tess, he seems to be removing her from her friends. Sophie proposes that they should celebrate Tess's birthday at her parents' house up north, which Alice readily agrees to. Rather than tell Simon the truth, she tells him it is a work trip to Minneapolis.

On the trip to the cottage, the trio makes a quick stop at a convenience store, where Alice spots a flyer for a missing girl, Andrea. The missing person case seems to consume Alice.

The three women spend time together at the cottage, the rural town, and a lake near the cottage. Simon discovers where they are from reading Alice's emails and calls her, demanding she leave and return to him. Alice packs up but Tess hides her phone and wallet, while Sophie goes to the store as an excuse for Tess and Alice to spend time together. Tess tries to teach Alice to paddle board on the lake. When Tess jokingly rocks the board, Alice falls off and loses her earring, a gift from Simon. In a panic, Alice attempts to dive down and find the earring. Unsuccessful, she returns to the shore where she suffers further panic attacks, muttering the phrase that she "can't do another thing wrong". When pressed by Tess, they have an argument and Alice confesses that she hid their vacation retreat from Simon. Tess questions Alice's well-being. Alice cancels her plan to leave, and the next morning she joins the search party for Andrea. Somewhere near an abandoned cottage she finds lipstick and thinks it belongs to Andrea.

Back in the cottage, the women repair their friendship and have a good time. Alice starts opening up to her friends, even at one point telling them that Simon never hurt her physically but eventually admitting Simon subjected her to emotional abuse. Alice stops responding to Simon's messages, leading him to show up unannounced with grocery bags in hand. That evening at a very tense dinner, Simon pulls out a newspaper showing the news that the body of the missing girl was found. Alice takes out the lipstick and says what she thinks about it. Simon condescendingly attempts to shut her down.

The next morning, Alice packs and leaves the cottage with Simon, surprising her friends. On the way to the main road, Simon stops his car at a junction allowing a long line of cyclists to pass. Sophie catches up with the car and breaks the back windshield using a maul. Alice gets out and locks eyes with Sophie, signalling to her friend that she does not want to go with Simon. Simon meanwhile demands for Alice to get back into the car, but she firmly declines. Tess steps in between Simon and Alice forcing Simon to give up. He walks back to the car and aggressively throws Alice's possessions out before driving away.

As the women continue their break, Alice rides the paddle board and takes a dive into the lake.

== Cast ==
- Anna Kendrick as Alice
- Kaniehtiio Horn as Tess
- Charlie Carrick as Simon
- Wunmi Mosaku as Sophie
- Mark Winnick as Marcus
- Carolyn Fe as Customer

== Production ==
In July 2021, it was announced Anna Kendrick, Charlie Carrick, Wunmi Mosaku, and Kaniehtiio Horn would star in the film, with Mary Nighy directing from a screenplay by Alanna Francis, with Elevation Pictures set to distribute domestically in Canada and Lionsgate internationally.

Principal photography took place from June 21 to July 20, 2021, in Toronto. The film doesn't hide the fact that the story is set in Toronto and surrounding areas, with location names and landmarks appearing clearly throughout the film.

== Release ==
The film was released in a limited capacity on December 30, 2022, in Los Angeles at the AMC Sunset 5, before having a wide release on January 20, 2023, in AMC Theatres. It had its world premiere at the 2022 Toronto International Film Festival on September 11, 2022.

The film was released for VOD on February 3, 2023. It was released for Blu-ray and DVD on March 14, 2023.

== Reception ==
On the review aggregator website Rotten Tomatoes, 84% of 122 critics' reviews are positive, with an average rating of 6.7/10. The website's consensus reads: "Alice, Darling offers a haunting look at how difficult it can be to leave an abusive relationship -- and the value of a solid support network." Metacritic, which uses a weighted average, assigned the film a score of 65 out of 100, based on 35 critics, indicating "generally favorable" reviews.

=== Accolades ===
Award	Date of ceremony	Category	Recipient(s)	Result	Ref.
Canadian Screen Awards	April 16, 2023	Best Art Direction/Production Design	Jennifer Morden	Nominated	
Golden Trailer Awards	June 29, 2023	Best Independent Trailer	"Beautiful Girl"	Nominated	
CMPA IndieScreen Awards	September 7, 2023	Kevin Tierney Emerging Producer Award	Katie Bird Nolan and Lindsay Tapscott	Nominated	
