= The Fine Art of Love =

2005 film

- A promotional poster using the film's Italian title
- Directed by: John Irvin
- Written by: James Carrington; Sadie Jones
- Produced by: Ida Di Benedetto
- Starring: Jacqueline Bisset; Hannah Taylor-Gordon; Mary Nighy; Natalia Tena
- Cinematography: Fabio Zamarion
- Music by: Paul Grabowsky
- Release dates: 31 August 2005 (Venice Film Festival); 25 November 2006
- Running time: 102 minutes
- Countries: Italy; UK; Czech Republic
- Language: English

The Fine Art of Love is a 2005 erotic drama film directed by John Irvin. The film, starring Jacqueline Bisset, Hannah Taylor-Gordon and Mary Nighy, is based on Mine-Haha, or On the Bodily Education of Young Girls by the German playwright Frank Wedekind. It received its premiere at the 2005 Venice Film Festival.

== Plot ==
Thuringia, Germany, in the early 20th century. A group of young girls are brought up in a college amid dark forests and gloomy dull lakes. Young Hidalla and her friends Irene, Vera, Blanka, Melusine and Rain are brought up in an isolated world: the girls know nothing about life beyond the college's high walls. They play near a beautiful waterfall and are ordered not to make contact with the servants, who are categorized as inferior people and wear masks to cover their faces. The girls are instructed in dance and music. Years later, Irene and Hidalla embark on a romantic relationship and are caught kissing in the school grounds by the servants. Vera begins to think that she is descended from royalty and attempts to unravel her origins, but finds that she was wrong. The six girls attempt to escape from the school but are confronted by guard dogs that attack and kill Melusine.

The girls are informed that they are going to hold a ballet presentation for a Prince. The best performer will be released from the school. A messenger arrives, ostensibly to check the girls' strength, but in reality she gropes them. Blanka is chosen as prima ballerina, but Irene, feeling Hidalla rightfully deserves the position, reveals to the Headmistress that she is sexually involved with another student, which turns out to be true after she stumbles upon them. After this, Hidalla is chosen as the prima ballerina.

When the ballet is finally held, the Prince becomes aroused by Hidalla's performance and tosses a rose at the stage. Intrigued, Hidalla continues strongly with her performance, and a terrified Irene commits suicide minutes before the final act. Shocked and enraged, Hidalla sets fire to the theater during the final act and is carried out by the Prince. The Headmistress is told that she is given the choice of a janitorial position and social ridicule and exile by peers at the school, or "the honorable decision" (her own death); while waiting in an official's office, she has a small glass of scotch and shoots herself in the mouth with the gun that was provided on the table. Hidalla is taken to the Prince's palace, where he brutally rapes her. The next morning she escapes the palace, only to stumble upon the school. She screams as she realizes her fate and the fate of the other girls: to become concubines and/or sex slaves for wealthy men, mostly the Prince. The last shot is a horse carriage, possibly carrying young baby girls to the school, coming through the gate, with the doors slamming behind it.

== See also ==
- Innocence, a 2004 French film adaptation of Wedekind's novella
