= Frederick S. Armitage =

American film director (1874 - 1933)

- Born: June 19, 1874; Seneca Falls, New York
- Died: January 3, 1933 (aged 58); Ecorse, Michigan
- Occupations: Cinematographer, director

Frederick S. Armitage (June 19, 1874 in Seneca Falls, New York – January 3, 1933 in Ecorse, Michigan) was an early American motion picture cinematographer and director, working primarily for the American Mutoscope and Biograph Company. Often identified as "F.S. Armitage" in AM&B paperwork, Armitage had a hand in creating more than 400 often very short subjects for AM&B in the days where its films were made as much for the hand-crank operated Mutoscope device as for projection. Several of Armitage's subjects stand out from the company's regular routine of actualities and comic skits in their innovative use of camerawork, superimpositions, time-lapse photography and other effects then new to the art of film-making.

== Biography ==
Very little is known of Armitage's life, other than he was born in Seneca Falls, New York; his earliest known credits date from 1898. It isn't until 1899 when Armitage begins to collect a substantial number of film credits; he is credited with photographing 188 AM&B subjects in 1899 alone. Several of the actualities Armitage filmed that year had to do with the end of the Spanish–American War, including views of the battleships which fought in it and the welcome home parade thrown for Admiral Dewey in New York City. On June 9, 1899, Armitage was one of three Biograph cameramen to photograph the heavyweight championship bout between Jim Jeffries and Tom Sharkey, the finished film running a then-record time of 135 minutes.

A Nymph of the Waves (1900), in which waves are superimposed on a dancer

From 1900, Armitage began making a small number of films which utilized what would have then been considered trick effects; in two very similar subjects, The Prince of Darkness and A Terrible Night, Armitage reversed the negative so that the clothes a man removed seemed to be leaping back at him. In A Nymph of the Waves, Armitage combined two previously existing subjects in a printer in order to create a subject in which a dancer appeared to be floating on top of waves from Niagara Falls; Armitage used a similar technique in Davey Jones' Locker (1900). Armitage deliberately projected part of the negative in The Ghost Train (1901) and used time lapse photography—taken over a period of a month—in Demolishing and Building Up The Star Theater (1901). His most astonishing achievement, however, is the time-lapse subject Down the Hudson (1903), in which Armitage and fellow AM&B cinematographer A. E. Weed filmed a voyage down the Hudson River from Haverstraw Bay to Newburgh in single frames, producing a film lasting three minutes.

Among other interesting films that Armitage shot or directed during his AM&B period were some early martial arts films, films of Buffalo Bill's Wild West Show, actress Anna Held, music-hall singer Eugénie Fougère, and a silent film of Sousa's Band, short chapters of attempted "story films" on the popular plays Ten Nights in a Bar-Room (1901) and The Wages of Sin (1901), a number of subjects of American landmarks for the U.S. Department of the Interior and films of Native American life for the agency then called the U.S. Indian Department.

Armitage's last known work for AM&B was as cinematographer on Wallace McCutcheon Sr.'s The Nihilists (1905) and Wanted: A Dog (1905). Shortly afterward, he and McCutcheon both defected to the Edison Manufacturing Company. Though McCutcheon would return to AM&B in 1907, Armitage remained at Edison through at least 1910, working as a cinematographer with directors Edwin S. Porter and J. Searle Dawley. His whereabouts afterward are unclear; Armitage is credited with the cinematography on two obscure states rights features in 1916–1917, and then he vanishes from the historical record completely, until his recorded death on January 3, 1933.

== Legacy ==
Even a basic understanding of Frederick S. Armitage's contribution to film didn't get underway until the 1980s, with the work of Charles Musser, and a lot remains to be known about what he did and who he was. Nevertheless, interest has steadily grown since then; in 2002 Demolishing and Building Up The Star Theater was named to the Library of Congress' National Film Registry, and several of Armitage's films were included on a collection of pre-1943 American experimental films, Unseen Cinema, curated by Bruce Posner of the Anthology Film Archives.

== Selected online filmography ==
- 71st Regiment, Camp Wyckoff (1899)
- Fougere (1899)
- Governor Roosevelt and Staff (1899)
- “Grand Republic” passing “Columbia” (1899)
- Ladies Saddle Horses (1899)
- Park Davis’s Employees (1899)
- The Dandy Fifth (1899)
- The Dewey Arch (1899)
- The Serenaders (1899)
- 15th Infantry (1900)
- A Nymph of the Waves (1900)
- Skating on Lake, Central Park (1900)
- Chimmie Hicks at the Races (1900)
- The Ghost Train (1901)
- Demolishing and Building Up The Star Theater (1901)
- Brook Trout Fishing (1902)
- Buffalo Bill's Wild West Parade (1902)
- Skating on Lake, Central Park (1902)
- Star Theatre (1902)
- Birth of The Pearl (1903)
- Cake Walk (1903)
- Comedy Cake Walk (1903)
- Parade of "Exempt" Firemen (1903)
- Ameta (1903)
- As In A Looking Glass (1903)
- Drill by Providence Police (1903)
- How Tommy got a pull on his Grandpa (1903)
- Noon Hour, Hope Webbing Co. (1903)
- Parade of “exempt” firemen (1903)
- Pawtucket Fire Department (1903)
- Bargain Day, 14th Street, New York (1905)

== Bibliography ==
- Musser, Charles (1994). The Emergence of Cinema: The American Screen to 1907. University of California Press. ISBN 978-05-20085-33-6.
