= André Levinson =

French dance journalist (1887–1933)

André Yacovlev Levinson, Андрей (Андрэ) Яковлевич Левинсон [Andrey Yakovl'evich Levinson], November 1, 1887, St. Petersburg - December 3, 1933, Paris) was, after leaving Russia in 1918, a French dance journalist. He was awarded the Ordre national de la Légion d'honneur.

At the University of Sankt Peterburg he had been a professor of Romance languages. With regard to ballet, he then championed "pure academic dance". Accordingly, he opposed many innovations advanced by choreographer Michel Fokine and impresario Sergei Diaghilev of Ballets Russes. In 1918 Levinson left Russia for Lithuania, then Germany, arriving in Paris in 1921. He taught a course in Russian literature at the Sorbonne. Then Ballets Russes regularly performed in Paris, where it continued to draw great interest.

Due to the arrival of Levinson and another Russian dance critic, the "French were treated to informed observation of the dance scene in print." Many books, among them volumes on Léon Bakst (1921), Ana Pavlova (1928), and Serge Lifar (1934, posthumous), were authored by Levinson. Of course, he did not confine himself to Russian ballet.

"The Russian critic André Levinson, although an unyielding defender of classicism in ballet, was nonetheless awed by Isadora's art as 'the cult of the transfigured flesh, the religion of the body, the habitat of the gods'."

A selection of his dance writings from Paris was published in 1991.

== Literary works ==
- Meister des Ballets, 1923
- La Argentina, 1928
- La danse d'aujourd'hui, 1929
