= Eugénie Fougère (demimondaine) =

French murder victim

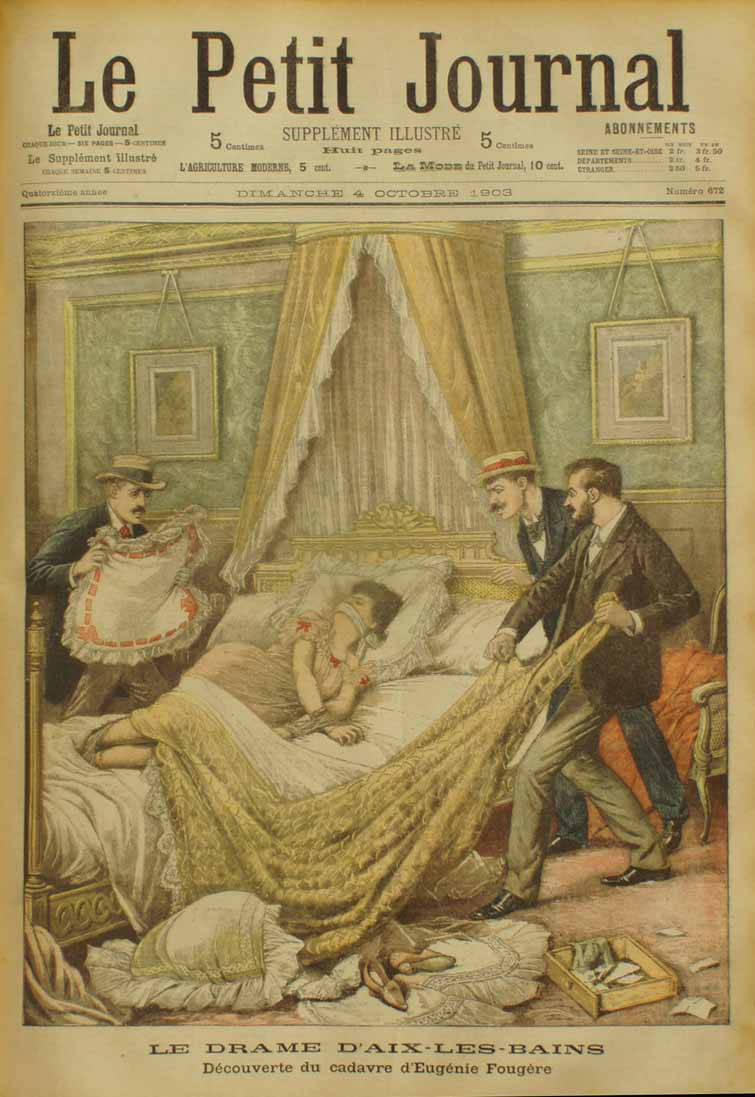
- Cover of Le Petit Journal of October 4, 1903, about the murder of Fougère in Aix-les-Bains
- Born: March 17, 1861; Chambon-sur-Voueize, France
- Died: September 20, 1903 (aged 42); Aix-les-Bains, France
- Cause of death: Strangled
- Body discovered: Aix-les-Bains

Eugénie Fougère (Chambon-sur-Voueize, March 17, 1861 - Aix-les-Bains, September 20, 1903) was a French frequenter of the demi-monde. She was notorious for her luxurious jewelry and costumes.

She should not be confused with the vaudeville actress also named Eugénie Fougère, although the two knew each other, mixed in the same circles, and even lived in the same street in Paris for a while.

== Life ==
Fougère was born in 1861 in Chambon-sur-Voueize, a small town in the Limousin region in central France. In 1880, she left Chambon-sur-Voueize at the age of 19 and went to Montluçon where she began to work as a waitress and maid. Quickly, her beauty was remarked and she received some nicknames, such as Miss chocolate. Soon she followed a lover to live in Paris and became a model of a major fashion house.

She started to frequent the demi-monde in Paris, Monaco, Biarritz, Nice and even South America. She spent her winters at the casino in Monte Carlo and her summers in the posh spa Aix-les-Bains. Eventually she started using opium and ether.

== Murder ==
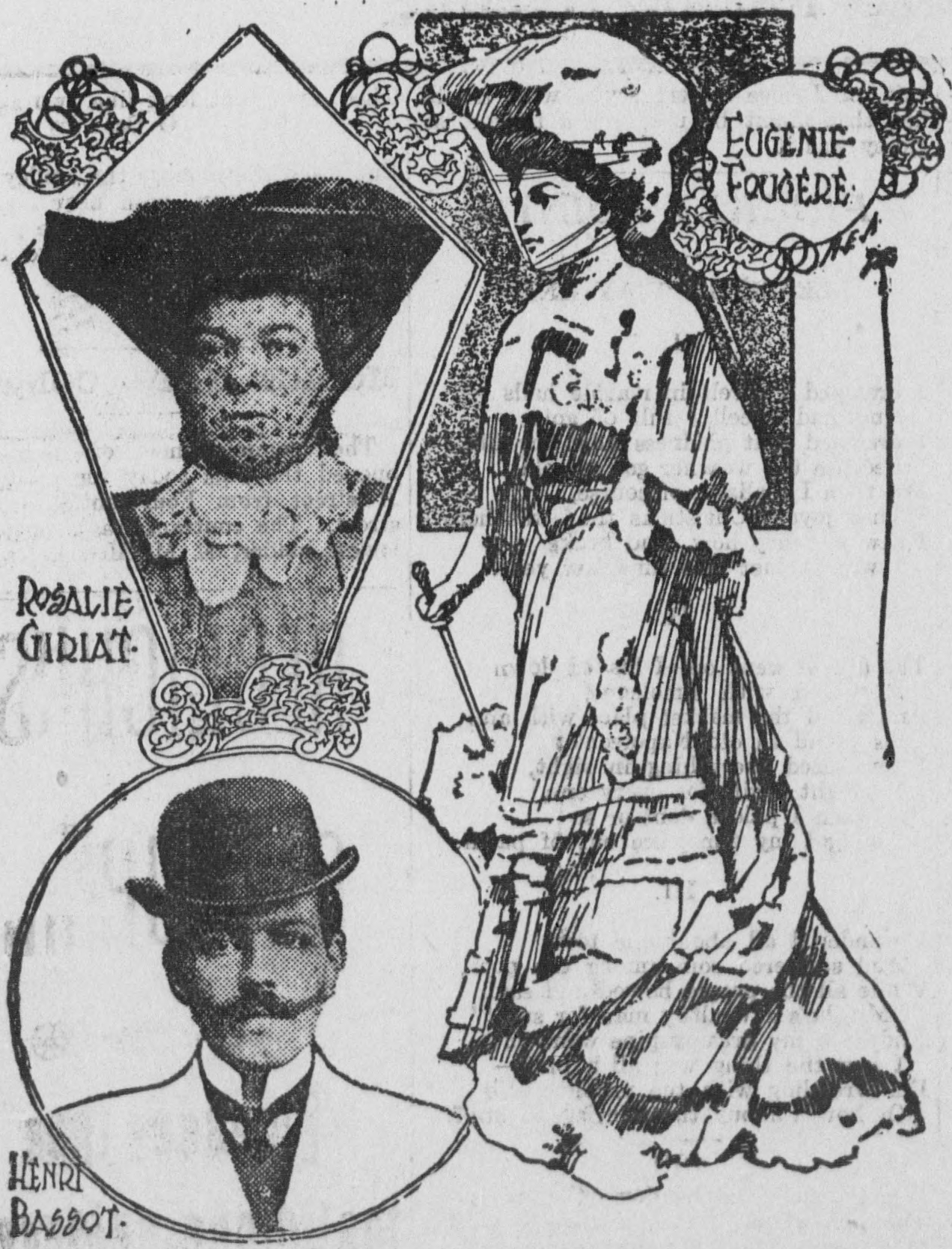
Fougère, Giriat (referred to here as "Rosalie" rather than "Victorine"), and Bassot

In the morning of September 20, 1903, she was murdered along with one of her housemaids in the luxury guest house Villa Solms in Aix-les-Bains, a fashionable water cure with a casino at the time. The crime was supposedly committed by thieves who wanted to obtain her jewelry. A female servant was also murdered, and another was "so maltreated that she had lost her reason".

Police investigations revealed that the suffering female servant, Victorine Giriat, in fact organised the murder with one Henri Bassot, who acted as the mastermind.
