= Mary Nighy =

English actress (born 1984)

- Born: 17 July 1984 (age 42); London, England
- Occupations: Actress; filmmaker
- Years active: 1998–present
- Children: 2
- Parents: Bill Nighy (father); Diana Quick (mother)

Mary Bing Jamie Alfreda Leonora Quick Kit Nighy (/naɪ/ NY; born 17 July 1984) is an English former actress, now a filmmaker and film director.

As an actress, she starred in The Lost Prince (2003), Spooks (2004), Rosemary & Thyme (2004), The Fine Art of Love: Mine Ha-Ha (2005), and Tormented (2009). As a director, she has directed episodes the television series Silent Witness (2018), Traces (2019–2020), Industry (2020), Say Nothing (2024), and the feature film Alice, Darling (2023).

== Early life ==
Nighy was born on 17 July 1984 in London. She is the daughter of actors Bill Nighy and Diana Quick. She was educated at the City of London School for Girls and Westminster School, where she became involved as the director of the school play Be My Baby at aged 16. Nighy graduated from University College London in 2006, with first-class honours in English. She won a scholarship to the National Film and Television School at Beaconsfield Film Studios.

== Career ==
=== Acting ===
She starred alongside Jacqueline Bisset in The Fine Art of Love: Mine Ha-Ha (2005), which had its premier at the 2005 Venice Film Festival. She guest starred as Jemma Roberts in Spooks (2004), guest starred as Fern in Rosemary & Thyme (2004), and starred in The Lost Prince (2003).

Her last appearance as an actress in film was as Helena in Tormented (2009).

=== Directing ===
After making two short films, and directing two plays, she was named one of the UK Film Council's '2005 Breakthrough Brits' as a film-maker.

In 2008, she directed the short film Player, starring Pete Postlethwaite and Celia Imrie.

In 2012, she directed the play Shallow Slumber at the Soho Theatre, London.

Her debut feature as director, Alice, Darling, starring Anna Kendrick and Wunmi Mosaku, and had its premier in September 2022, at the Toronto International Film Festival.

== Acting credits ==
- Tormented (2009) as Helena
- Marple: at Bertram's Hotel (2007, TV movie) as Brigit
- Gallathea (2007, staged reading) as Phillida
- Marie-Antoinette (2006) as Princesse de Lamballe
- The Fine Art of Love: Mine Ha-Ha (2005) as Hidalla
- Spooks/ MI-5(2004) (TV series)
- Rosemary & Thyme (2004, TV series)
- The Lost Prince (2003, TV)
- Invitation to the Waltz (2001, radio play)
- The Young Ambassadors (1998, radio play)

== Directing credits ==
- Alice, Darling (2023) - feature film
- Say Nothing (2024) episode 3 - "I'll Be Seeing You & episode 4 - "Tout"
- Industry (2020) Season 1 - episode 7 - "Pre-Crisis Activity"
- Traces (2019–2020) Season 1 - episodes 4, 5, and 6.
- Silent Witness (2018) Season 22 - episodes 7 & 8 - "Deathmaker: Part 1 & 2
- Shallow Slumber (2012 play) Soho Theatre, London.
- Player (2008) Short film
