= Pandora's Box (play) =

Tragedy written by Frank Wedekind

Pandora's Box (German: Die Büchse der Pandora) is a 1904 play by the German dramatist Frank Wedekind. It forms the second part of his pairing of Lulu plays, the first being Earth Spirit (German: Erdgeist, first printed in 1895), both of which depict a society "driven by the demands of lust and greed".

G. W. Pabst directed a silent film version Pandora's Box (1929), which was loosely based on the play. Both plays together also formed the basis for the opera Lulu by Alban Berg in 1935 (premiered posthumously in 1937).

In the original manuscript, dating from 1894, the 'Lulu' drama was in five acts and subtitled 'A Monster Tragedy'. Wedekind subsequently divided the work into two plays: Earth Spirit and Pandora's Box (German: Die Büchse der Pandora). It is now customary in theatre performances to run the two plays together, in abridged form, under the title Lulu. Wedekind is known to have taken his inspiration from at least two sources: the pantomime Lulu by Félicien Champsaur, which he saw in Paris in the early 1890s, and the sex murders of Jack the Ripper in London in 1888.

The premiere of Pandora's Box, a restricted performance due to difficulties with the censor, took place in Nuremberg on 1 February 1904. The 1905 Viennese premiere, again restricted, was instigated by the satirist Karl Kraus. In Vienna Lulu was played by Tilly Newes, later to become Wedekind's wife, with the part of Jack the Ripper played by Wedekind himself.

== Plot ==
Act One (Germany). At the end of Earth Spirit, Lulu was imprisoned for the murder of her third husband, Dr Schön. Pandora's Box opens with her confederates awaiting her arrival after she has been sprung from prison in an elaborate plot. The lesbian Countess Geschwitz, who remains in love with Lulu, has swapped identities with her and takes Lulu's place in prison, hoping that Lulu will love her in return. Rodrigo Quast, the acrobat, plans to take Lulu away with him as a circus performer but when she arrives, emaciated from the prison regime, he declares her unfit for his purposes. Alwa Schön, the writer, succumbs to her charms, despite her having murdered his father. They leave together.

Act Two (Paris). Lulu and Alwa, now married, are entertaining in their lavish home. All are profiting from investments in the Jungfrau cable-car company. Two characters attempt to blackmail her, since she is still wanted by the German police: Rodrigo the acrobat and Casti-Piani, a white slave-trader who offers to set her up in a brothel in Cairo. The sinister Schigolch, who was Lulu's first patron and may be her father, reappears, and by offering to lure Rodrigo and Geschwitz to his lodgings, promises to "take care of" the threatening Rodrigo. As the police arrive to arrest her, Lulu swaps clothes with a groom and escapes. The Jungfrau share price has meanwhile collapsed, leaving her penniless.

Act Three (London). Lulu is now living in a garret with Alwa and Schigolch and working as a prostitute. Geschwitz arrives with the rolled-up portrait of Lulu as an innocent Pierrot which has accompanied Lulu throughout the action of this play and its predecessor. Lulu's first client is the pious mute Mr Hopkins. Alwa is killed by her next visitor, the African prince Kungu Poti. Another client, the bashful Dr Hilti, flees in horror and Geschwitz tries unsuccessfully to hang herself. 'Jack' (putatively Jack the Ripper), her final client, argues with her about her fee. Geschwitz vows to return to Germany to matriculate and fight for women's rights. Jack murders Lulu and Geschwitz; the latter dies declaring eternal love for Lulu.

== Reception ==
The play has attracted a wide range of interpretations, from those who see it as misogynist to those who claim Wedekind as a harbinger of women's liberation. Central to these divergent readings is the ambiguous figure of Lulu herself. Each man in her life, secure in the patriarchal society to which she is a potential affront, finds in her what he wants to see. Her own needs, meanwhile, remain obscured. And each man "lets her down because he is flawed by a blind disregard for her true self, an indifference that stems from that blend of self-centredness and self-interest which Wedekind ... saw as typically male". Whether Lulu is victim or femme fatale, the centre of gravity in this second play shifts in the direction of Geschwitz, whom Wedekind describes, in his preface to the 1906 edition, as the "tragic central figure of the play", and holds up as an example of both "superhuman self-sacrifice" and spiritual strength in the face of the "terrible destiny of abnormality with which she is burdened".
