= La Tortajada =

Spanish dancer and singer (1867–1957)

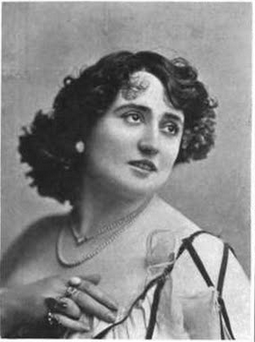
- La Tortajada, from a 1904 publication

Background information
- Born: Consuelo Tamayo Hernández; 6 May 1876; Santa Fe, Granada, Spain
- Died: 7 February 1957 (aged 80) Santa Fe, Granada, Spain
- Occupation: Vaudeville performer

Consuelo Tamayo Hernández (6 May 1867—7 February 1957), known professionally as La Tortajada, was a Spanish dancer and singer in vaudeville.

== Early life ==
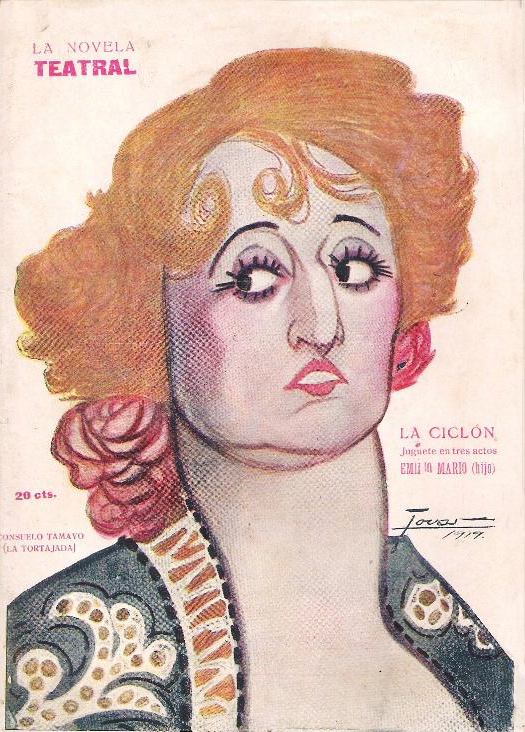
Consuelo Tamayo by Tovar (1919)

Consuelo Tamayo was born in Santa Fe, Granada. She was educated at a convent, and trained to dance and sing there, and in Madrid. At age 14, Consuelo Tamayo married Ramón Tortajada, her music teacher and agent.

== Career ==
La Tortajada toured internationally for more than twenty years, as a popular Spanish dancing and musical act on the vaudeville circuit. She is one of the Spanish dancers credited with introducing the fandango to North American audiences. "Of all the Spanish dancers America has ever seen," commented an American newspaper writer in 1902, "she is far and away the best."

Publicity surrounding La Tortajada focused on violence and passion, reinforcing stereotypes about the "fiery" Spanish temperament. In North America she was billed as "The Lady of the Duels", with publicity suggesting that she was fought over in duels throughout Europe. She had a physical confrontation with a rival over the design of a costume, in 1894.

== Personal life ==
She retired from the stage after 1913 and returned to Granada to live in Santa Fe. She was reported to be living in seclusion with her husband and son in 1926. Ramón Tortajada died in 1928. Consuelo Tamayo died in 1957, aged 90 years. There is a street named for her (Calle Consuelo Tamayo la Tortajada) in Santa Fe, Granada.
