= Frank Wedekind =

German playwright (1864–1918)

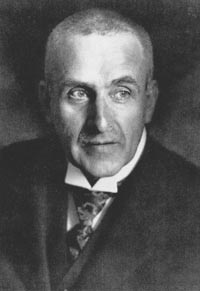
- Born: Benjamin Franklin Wedekind; July 24, 1864; Hanover, German Confederation
- Died: March 9, 1918 (aged 53); Munich, German Empire
- Occupation: Playwright
- Relatives: Erika Wedekind (sister)
- Family: Wedekind zur Horst

Signature
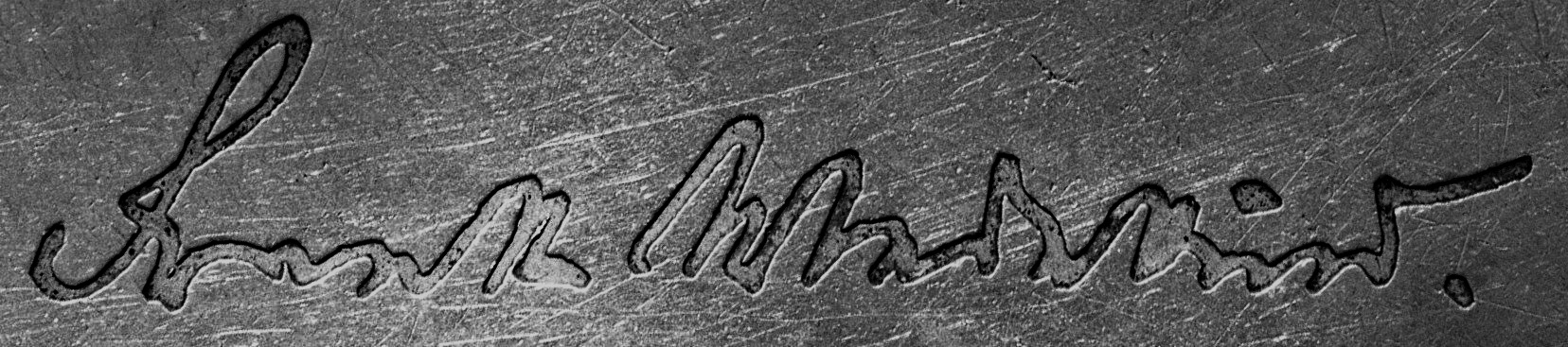

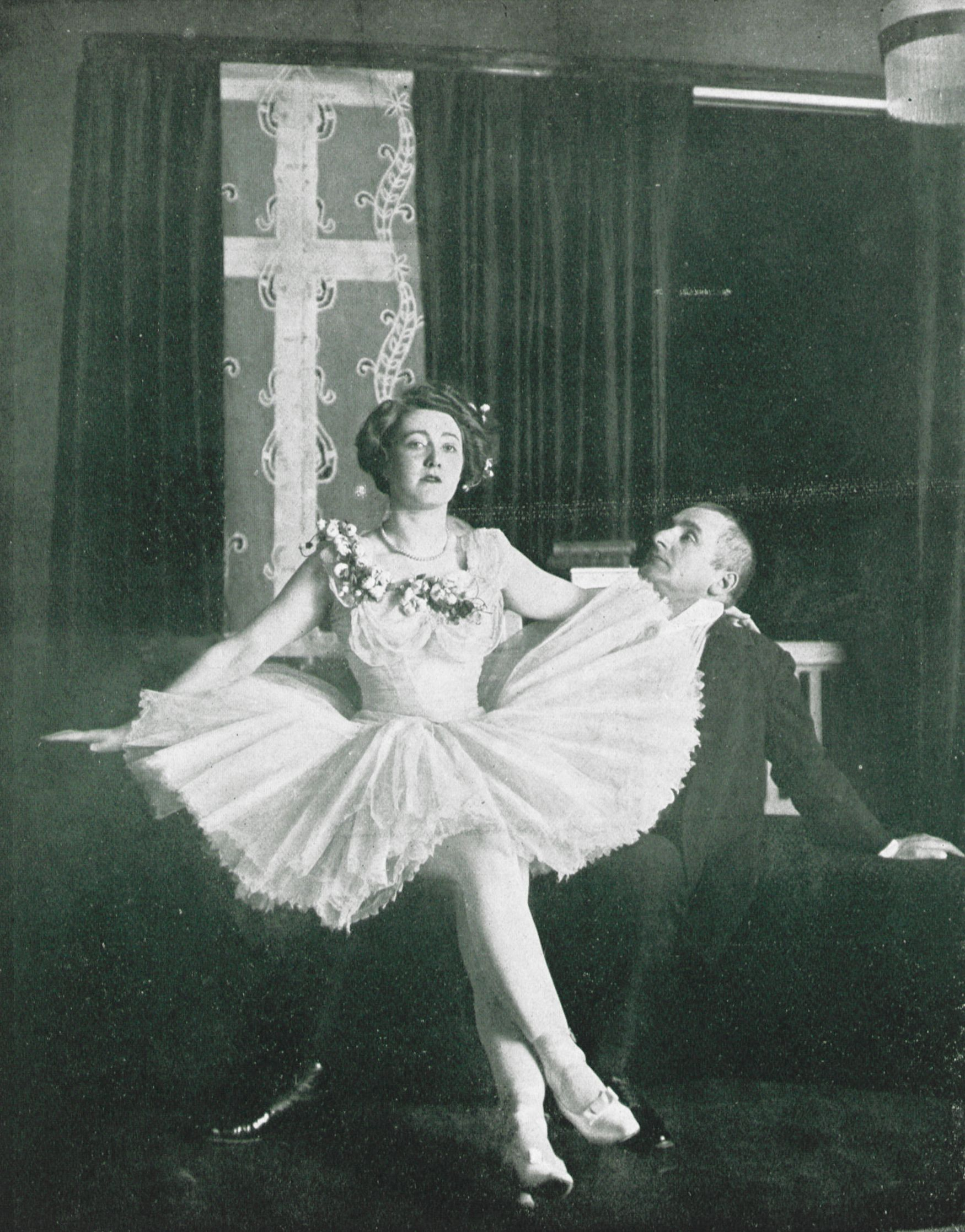
Wedekind and his wife Tilly, 1910

Benjamin Franklin Wedekind (July 24, 1864 – March 9, 1918) was a German playwright. His work, which often criticizes bourgeois attitudes (particularly towards sex), is considered to anticipate expressionism and was influential in the development of epic theatre.

In the English-speaking world, before 2006, Wedekind was best known for the "Lulu" cycle, a two-play series—Erdgeist (Earth Spirit, 1895) and Die Büchse der Pandora (Pandora's Box, 1904)—centered on a young dancer/adventuress of mysterious origin. In 2006 his earlier play Frühlings Erwachen (Spring Awakening, 1891) became well known because of a Broadway musical adaptation.

== Life and career ==
Benjamin Franklin Wedekind was born on July 24, 1864, in Hanover, German Confederation, Große Aegidienstraße 13 (today: Friedrichswall 10). His mother was Swiss and became pregnant with him in San Francisco. His father, a German, had a Swiss castle in which Wedekind grew up, after the family had left Hanover in 1872. Until World War I, when he was forced to obtain a German passport, he was an American citizen and traveled throughout Europe. He lived most of his adult life in Munich, though he had a brief period working in advertising, for the Maggi soup firm, in Switzerland in 1886.

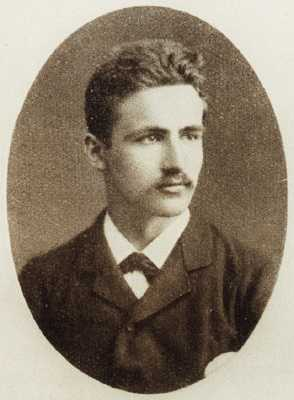
Wedekind in 1883

Having worked in business and the circus, Wedekind went on to become an actor and singer. In this capacity, he received wide acclaim as the principal star of the satirical cabaret Die elf Scharfrichter ("The Eleven Executioners"), launched in 1901. Wedekind became an important influence on the tradition of German satirical writing for the theatre, paving the way for the cabaret-song satirists Kurt Tucholsky, Walter Mehring, Joachim Ringelnatz and Erich Kästner among others, who after Wedekind's death would invigorate the culture of the Weimar Republic; "all bitter social critics who used direct, stinging satire as the best means of attack and wrote a large part of their always intelligible light verse to be declaimed or sung". At the age of 34, after serving a nine-month prison sentence (Festungshaft) for lèse-majesté (thanks to the publication in Simplicissimus of some of his satirical poems), Wedekind became a dramaturg (a play-reader and adapter) at the Munich Schauspielhaus.

His sex life was promiscuous and he frequented prostitutes, contracting syphilis. He also enjoyed the pleasure of platonic female company and kept his tendencies toward homosexuality and sadism in check. He had an affair with Frida Uhl, the wife of playwright August Strindberg, who bore him a child, the Swedish-Austrian journalist and author Friedrich Strindberg. In 1906, he married the Austrian actress Tilly Newes, 22 years his junior and became strictly monogamous. His relationship with his wife was turbulent: Wedekind was prone to jealousy and felt pressure to maintain strenuous creative and sexual activity in order to please her. They had two daughters, Pamela and Kadidja, but his jealousy led his wife to attempt both separation and suicide.

Near the end of his life, Wedekind underwent an appendectomy and immediately began acting again, leading to a hernia. His doctor refused to operate immediately, but Wedekind insisted; and complications from the surgery led to his death at the age of 53 on March 9, 1918.

Tilly Wedekind went on to appear in such films as Travelling People and was romantically linked to the author Gottfried Benn. In 1969, at age 83, she published an autobiography in German, Lulu: Die Rolle meines Lebens ("Lulu: The Role of My Life").

== Works ==
Wedekind's first major play, Frühlings Erwachen (Spring Awakening, 1891), which concerns sexuality and puberty among some young German students, caused a scandal, because it contained scenes of homoeroticism, implied group male masturbation, actual male masturbation, sado-masochism between a teenage boy and girl, rape and suicide, as well as references to abortion.

The "Lulu" plays Erdgeist (Earth Spirit, 1895) and Die Büchse der Pandora (Pandora's Box, 1904) were probably his best-known works until the 2006 adaptation of Spring Awakening. Originally conceived as a single play, the two pieces tell a continuous story of a sexually enticing young dancer who rises in society through her relationships with wealthy men but who later falls into poverty and prostitution. The frank depiction of sexuality and violence in these plays, including lesbianism and an encounter with Jack the Ripper (a role that Wedekind played in the original production), pushed the boundaries of what was considered acceptable on the stage at the time. Karl Kraus helped Wedekind stage it in Vienna.

Der Kammersänger ("The Court-Singer", 1899) is a one-act character study of a famous opera singer who receives a series of unwelcome guests at his hotel suite.

In Franziska (1910), the title character, a young girl, initiates a Faustian pact with the Devil, selling her soul for the knowledge of what it is like to live life as a man (reasoning that men seem to have all the advantages).

A number of Wedekind's works have been translated into English by Samuel Atkins Eliot Jr.

=== List of major works ===
- Frühlings Erwachen (The Awakening of the Spring, 1891)
- Erdgeist (Earth Spirit, 1895)
- Die Kammersänger (The Court-Singer or The Tenorist, 1899) [one-act play]
- Der Marquis von Keith (The Marquis of Keith, 1901)
- Mine-Haha, or On the Bodily Education of Young Girls (1903) [novella]
- König Nicolo oder So ist das Leben (King Nicolo, or Such is Life, 1902)
- Die Büchse der Pandora (Pandora's Box, 1904)
- Hidalla oder Sein und Haben (Hidalla, or Being and Having, 1905)
- Totentanz (The Dance of Death, 1905); later title 'Tod und Teufel' (Death and Devil)
- Musik (Music, 1906)
- Schloss Wetterstein (Castle Wetterstein, 1910)
- Franziska (1912)
- Bismarck (1916)
- Herakles (Heracles, 1917)

== Adaptations ==
The "Lulu" plays formed the basis for G. W. Pabst's acclaimed silent film Pandora's Box (1929), starring Louise Brooks as Lulu, and also Alban Berg's opera Lulu (1937), which is considered to be one of the masterpieces of twentieth-century opera. Walerian Borowczyk based his 1980 film Lulu on these plays. The plays were adapted into comic books by John Linton Roberson, published in 2013 and 2020. They also form the basis for the 2011 album Lulu, a collaboration between the rock musician Lou Reed and the heavy metal band Metallica.

Hidalla was used as a source for a libretto by Franz Schreker, intended to be set by Alexander von Zemlinsky, but later set by Schreker himself in 1915 as the opera Die Gezeichneten.

Der Kammersänger was adapted by composer Hugo Weisgall for his English-language opera The Tenor.

Wedekind's symbolist novella Mine-Haha, or On the Bodily Education of Young Girls (1903) was the basis for the films Innocence (2004) by Lucile Hadžihalilović and The Fine Art of Love (2005) by John Irvin.

In 2006, Frühlings Erwachen was adapted into the successful Broadway musical Spring Awakening.
