= Albert Guillaume =

French painter

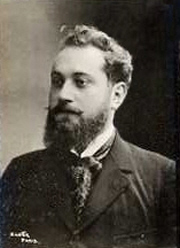
Albert Guillaume by Nadar

Albert Guillaume (14 February 1873 – 10 August 1942) was a French painter and caricaturist.

Born in Paris, France, Albert Guillaume became a leading caricaturist during the Belle Époque. While remembered for his poster art, Guillaume also did oil paintings such as "Soirée parisienne," a portrait of Parisian dinner society. He created theater posters as well as advertising posters that were greatly influenced by the work of one of the preeminent poster painters, Jules Chéret.

== Poster art ==
Guillaume thrived during the international poster mania of the Gay Nineties. During this period, a collection of notable artists helped transform the boulevards of Paris into a gallery of fine art. Toulouse-Lautrec set the stage in 1891 with his famous poster, Moulin Rouge. Other fine art posters followed and the streets came alive with color. Posters soon appeared from many of the era's great masters. Artists such as Chéret, Livemont, Hermann-Paul and Mucha helped shape the Parisian landscape.

Jules Chéret is often called the "father of the modern poster." From 1895 until 1900, he collaborated with the era's great poster artists to produce a series of smaller works suitable for collectors. For six years, Chéret and his collaborators painstakingly reproduced four posters a month. The series was a smashing success. The Maîtres de l'Affiche ("Masters of Posters") collection included the two works below and it was through this series that he became known to a wider audience. The collection remains popular to this day.

Posters from Les Maîtres de l'Affiche

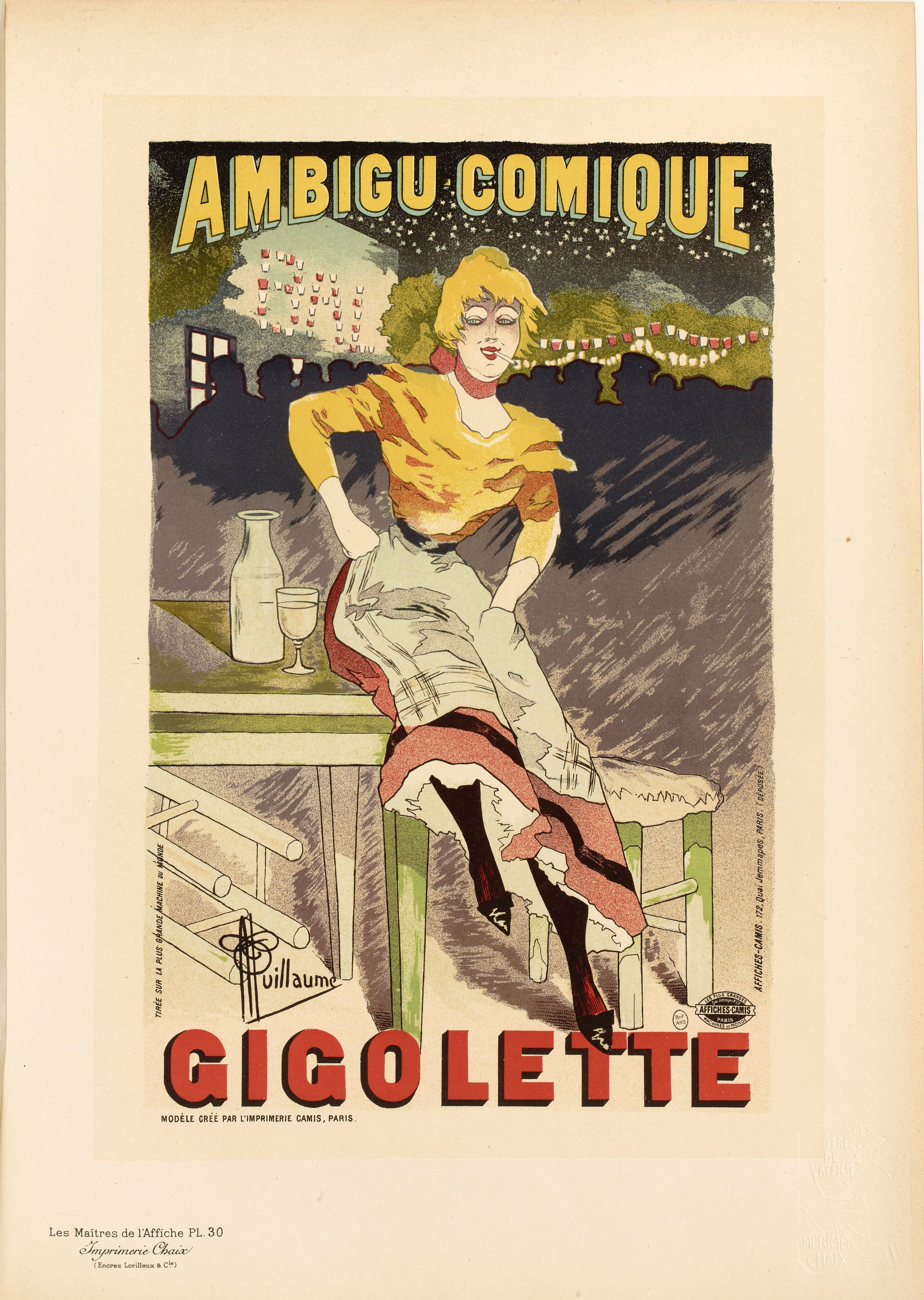
Poster 30

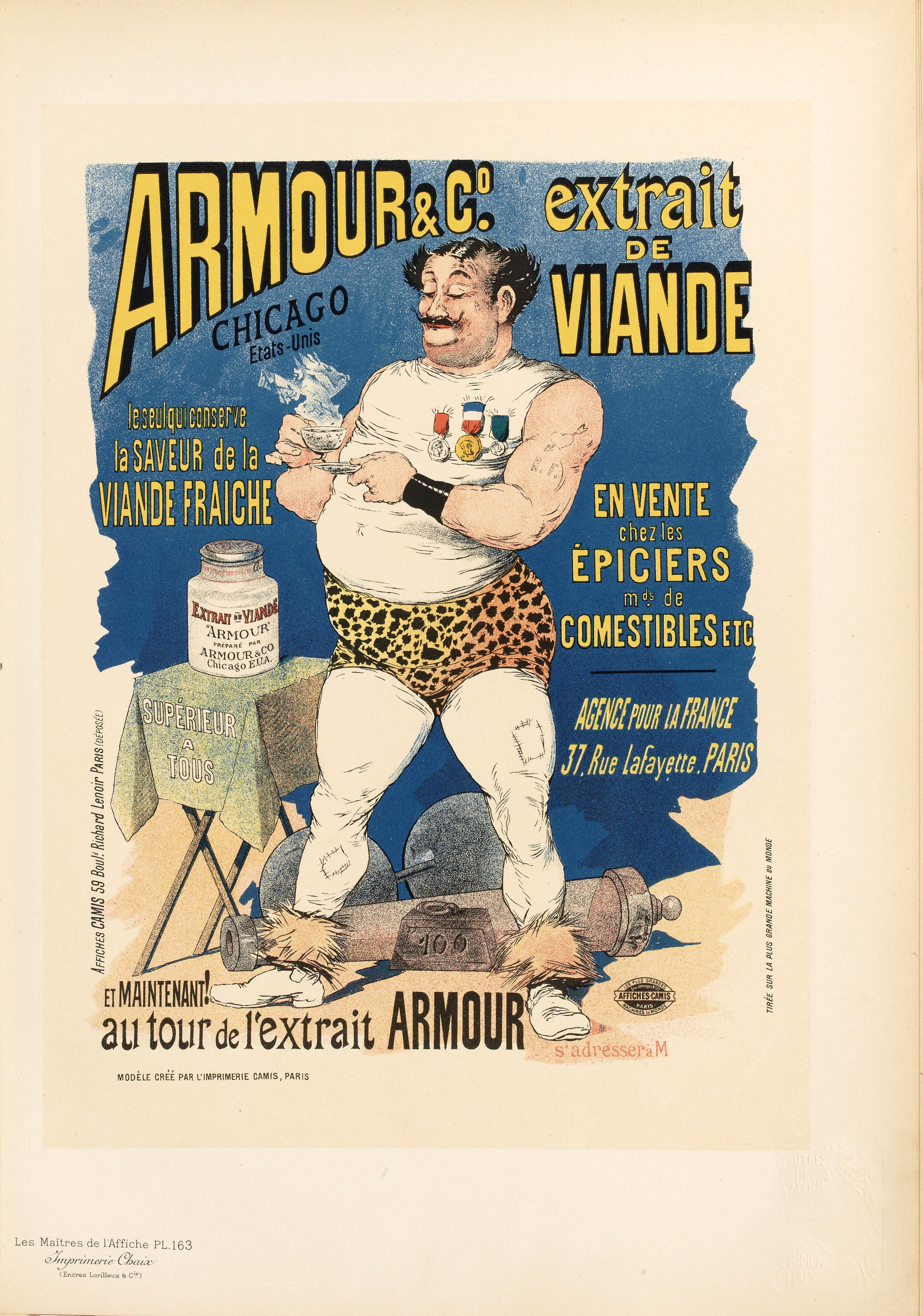
Poster 16

== Caricature ==
Guillaume is also known for satirical drawings that were published in Parisian humor magazines such as Gil Blas, Le Rire, L'Assiette au Beurre, and Le Figaro illustré. These magazines appeared as Parisians started to acquire an increased appetite for arts, culture and politics. Guillaume lampooned the foibles of French society at a time when French governance was frequently characterized by corruption and mismanagement.

== Recognition ==
The winner of a bronze medal at the Universal Exhibition of 1900 in Paris, Guillaume had many of his illustrations published in albums by such firms as "Ernest Maindron" and "Librairie illustrée, J. Tallandier" including three albums of military cartoons with the preface for the 1896 edition written by Georges Courteline.

== Death ==
Albert Guillaume died during the occupation in the rural village of Faux in the Dordogne département of France in 1942.
