= Gustave Fraipont =

French painter

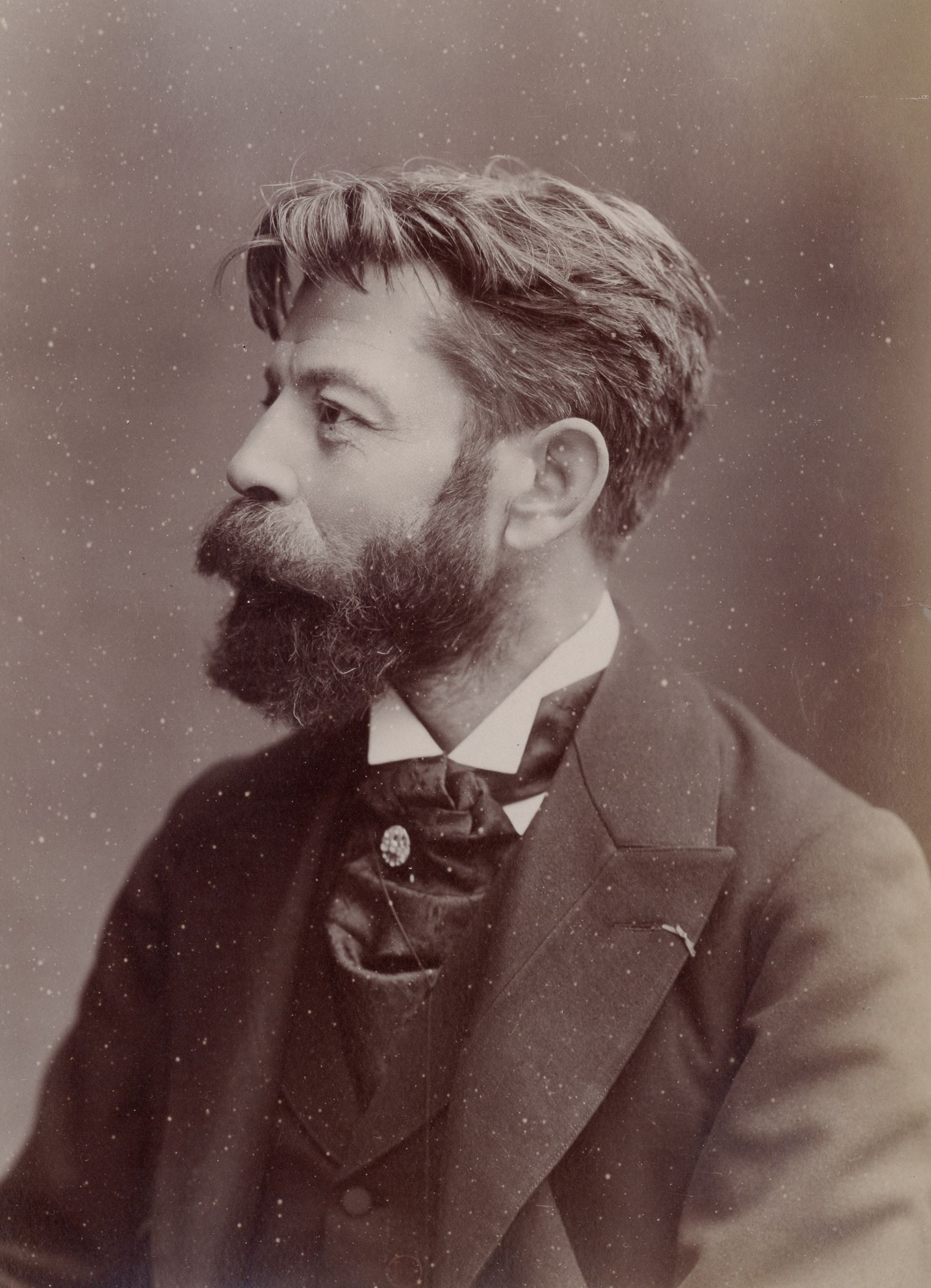
Gustave Fraipont photographed by Nadar

Gustave Fraipont (1 May 1849, Brussels – 30 April 1923, Paris) was a painter, sculptor, illustrator and poster-designer. Born in Belgium, he later became a naturalised French citizen.

Professor of drawing at the Maison d'éducation de la Légion d'honneur, he was the author of numerous books on the art of drawing. In 1885, he provided illustrations for the series Le Littoral de la France at the publisher Victor Palmé. He also illustrated books on Paris and the French regions. He produced books for young people such as 'André le meunier' (Andre the Miller') and 'et Yves le marin (Sailor Yves). He also illustrated the Letters from My Windmill, Perrault's Histoires ou contes du temps passé, Robinson Crusoe, Câline by Zenaide Fleuriot.

He painted numerous posters for railway companies, including Chemins de fer de l'Ouest and Compagnie des chemins de fer du Nord, as well as official documents and paper securities. His poster Pierrefonds, North company was reproduced in the magazine Les Maîtres de l'Affiche (1895–1900). He contributed to many newspapers and magazines, such as French and Paris Courier. In 1905, he was appointed Navy painter.

During World War I, he produced several compositions for the newspaper L'Illustration, including the monuments destroyed by war: Ypres Cloth Hall, Reims Cathedral and Arras Town Hall. Gustave Fraipont was the father of Georges Fraipont (1873–1912), a member of the Society of French Artists, also an illustrator of books, but especially known for his paintings.

== Gallery ==
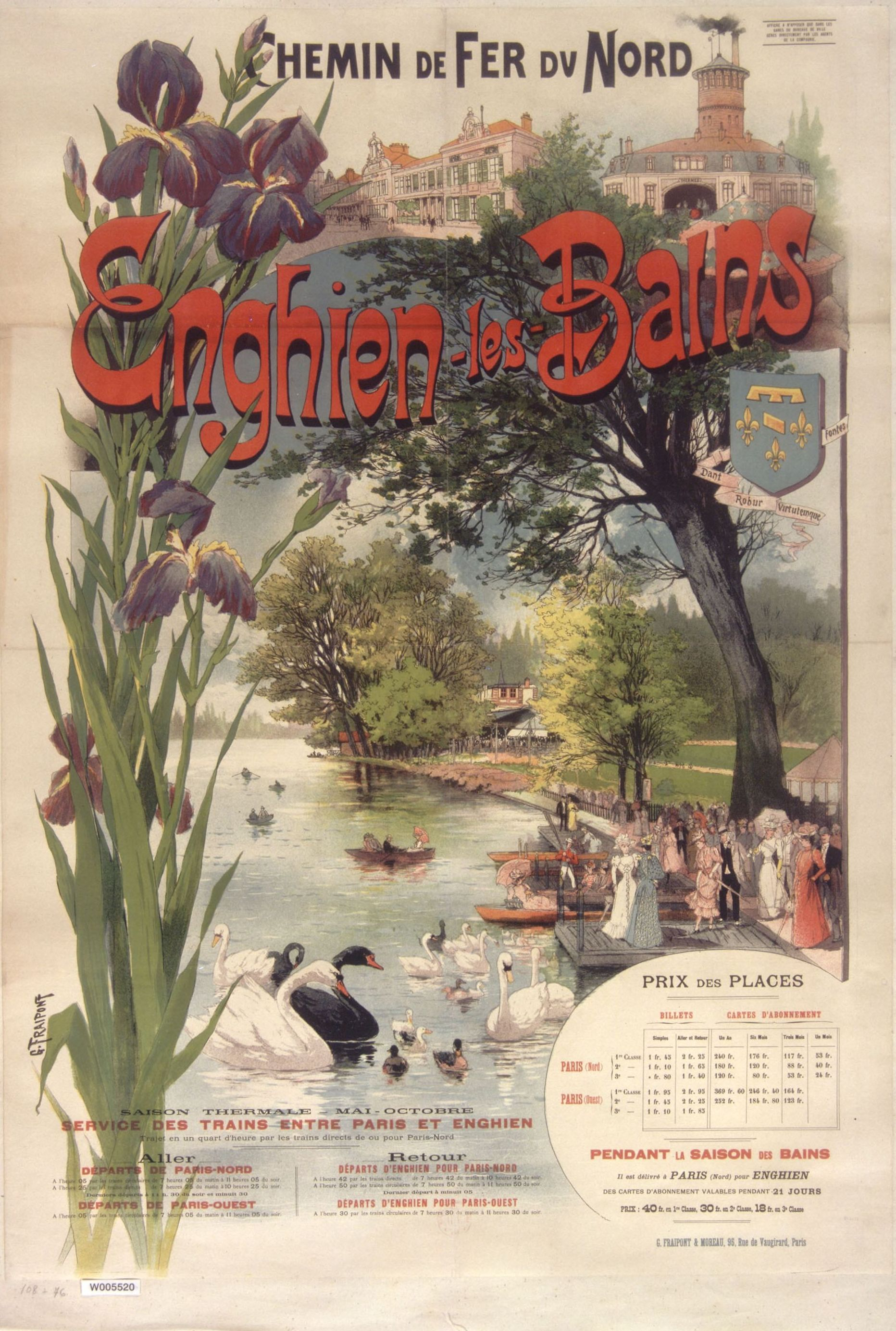

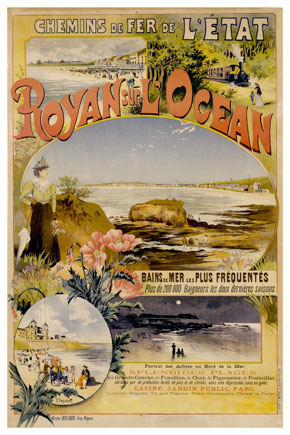

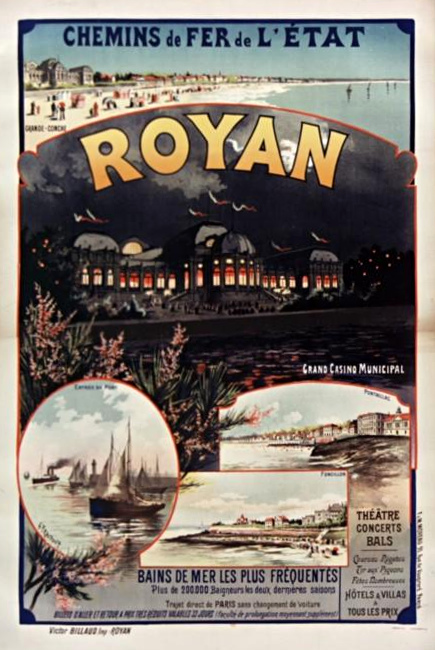

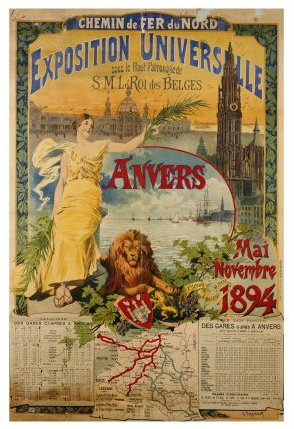

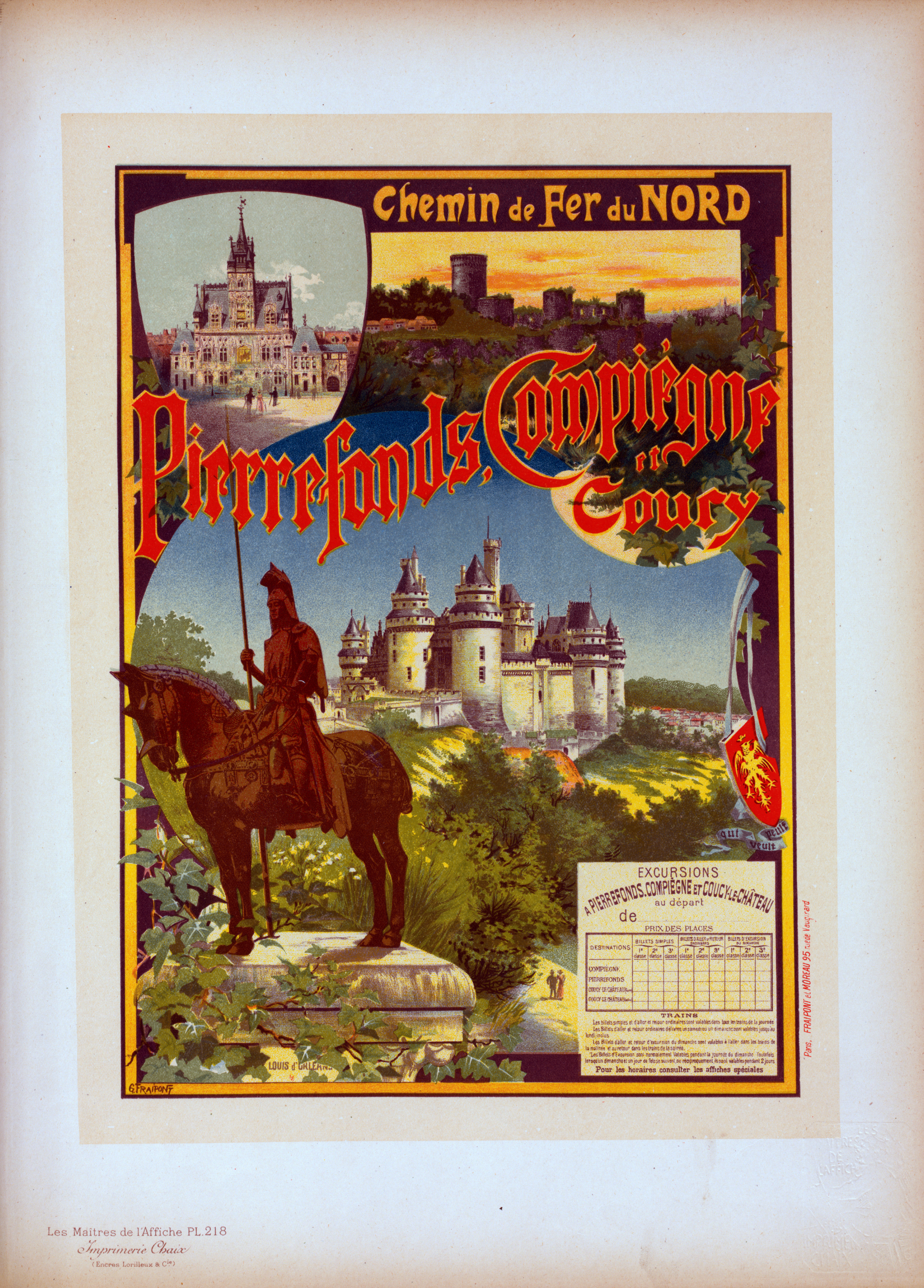
Poster 218 in Les Maîtres de l'Affiche

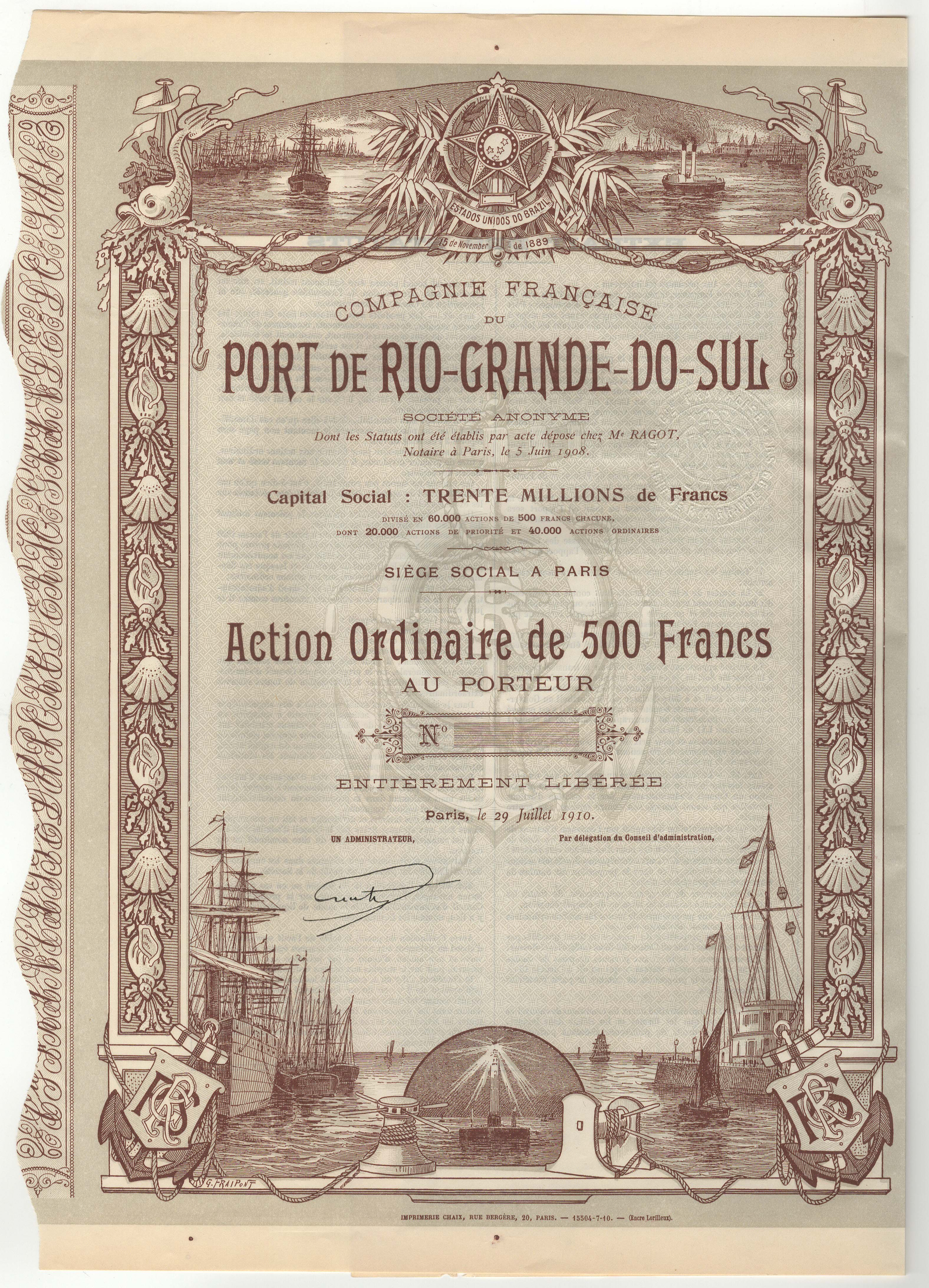
Share of the french company Port de Rio-Grande-do-Sul S. A. issued 29 July 1910, designed by Gustave Fraipont
