= Les Maîtres de l'Affiche =

Series of lithographic plates

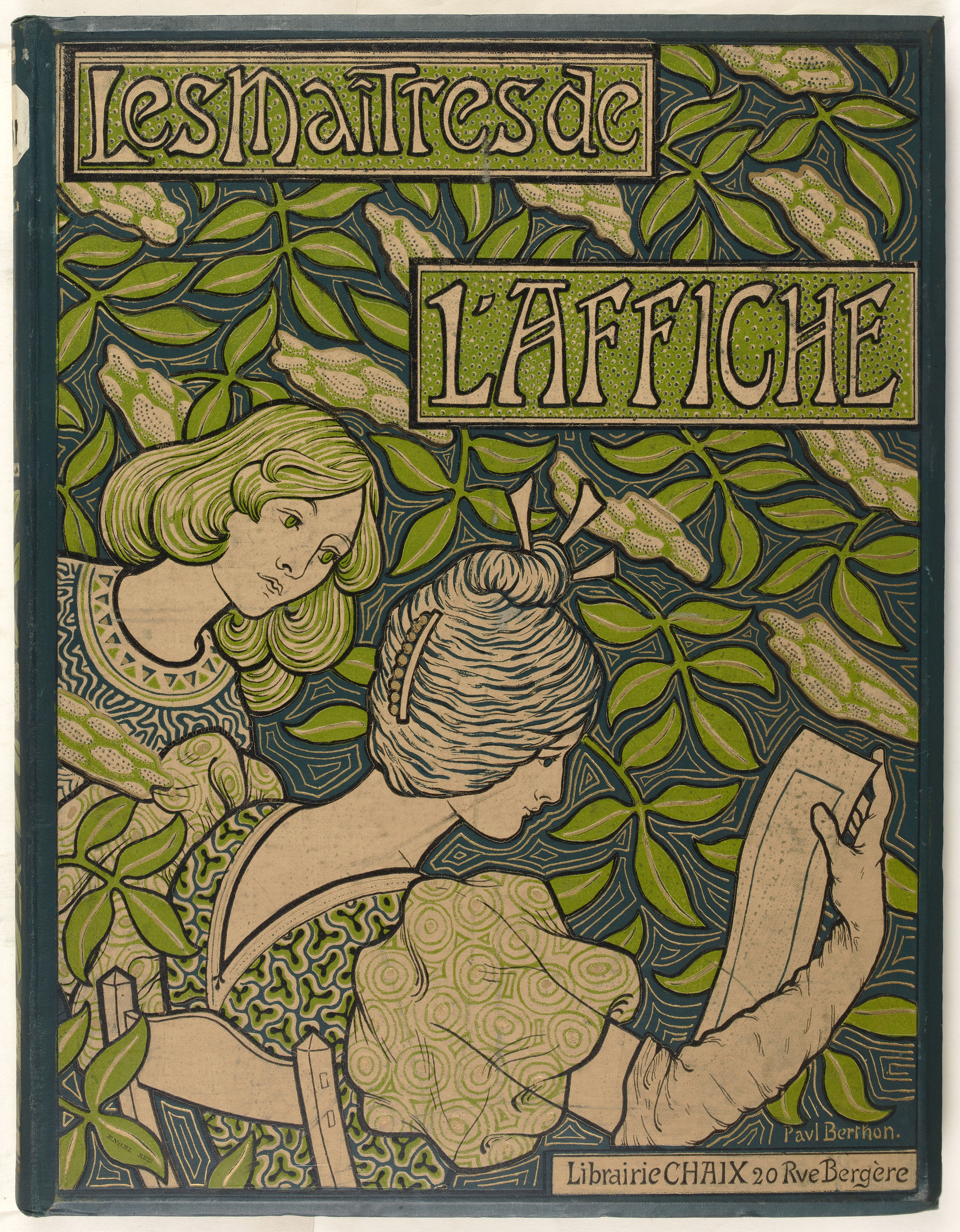
- Front cover by Paul Berthon (1895)
- Editor: Chaix
- Categories: Poster Art
- Frequency: monthly
- Format: 40×29cm
- Total circulation: 256 plates in 5 volumes
- Founder: Jules Chéret
- First issue: December 1895
- Final issue: November 1900
- Country: Paris, France

Maîtres de l'Affiche ('Masters of the Poster') refers to a series of 256 colour lithographic plates from an art publication (1895-1900) during the Belle Époque in Paris, France. The collection contained reproductions from the original works of ninety-seven artists in a smaller 40 cm × 29 cm (16 in × 11 in) format, and was bundled and edited by Jules Chéret, the father of poster art.

== Publication ==
The varied selection of prints were sold in packages of four and delivered monthly to subscribers. On sixteen occasions during the selling period between December 1895 through November 1900, the monthly package included a bonus of a specially created lithograph.

- Les Maîtres de l'affiche: volume 1 (in French). Paris: Chaix. 1895.

Volume 1 contains plates № 1 – № 48 and two original drawings by Jules Chéret.
The posters are on the Commons page : Posters in volume 1 of Maîtres de l'affiche

- Les Maîtres de l'affiche: volume 2 (in French). Paris: Chaix. 1896.

Volume 2 contains plates № 49 – № 96 and two original drawings by Jules Chéret, and Adolphe Willette.
The posters are on the Commons page : Posters in volume 2 of Maîtres de l'affiche

- Les Maîtres de l'affiche: volume 3 (in French). Paris: Chaix. 1898.

Volume 3 contains plates № 97 – № 144 and four original drawings by Jules Chéret, Georges de Feure, Henri-Gabriel Ibels, and Théophile Alexandre Steinlen.
The posters are on the Commons page : Posters in volume 3 of Maîtres de l'affiche

- Les Maîtres de l'affiche: volume 4 (in French). Paris: Chaix. 1899.

Volume 4 contains plates № 145 – № 192 and four original drawings by Jules Chéret, Crafty (artist), Théophile-Alexandre Steinlen, and Adolphe Willette.
The posters are on the Commons page : Posters in volume 4 of Maîtres de l'affiche

- Les Maîtres de l'affiche: volume 5 (in French). Paris: Chaix. 1900.

Volume 5 contains plates № 193 – № 240 and four original drawings by Paul Berthon, Jules Chéret (2), and Charles Léandre. (plates № 204 and № 212 are missing)
The posters are on the Commons page : Posters in volume 5 of Maîtres de l'affiche

== Selected posters ==
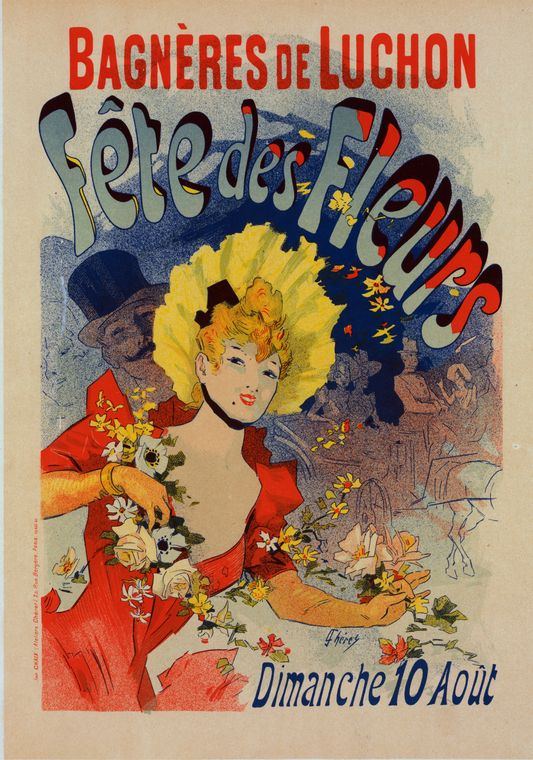
№ 1: Fête des Fleurs in Bagnères-de-Luchon – Jules Chéret (1890)

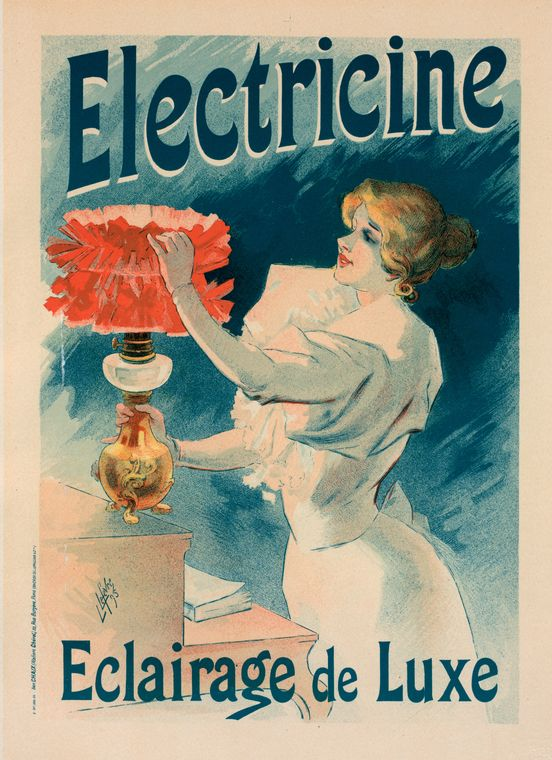
№ 55: Electricine – Lucien Lefèvre (1897)

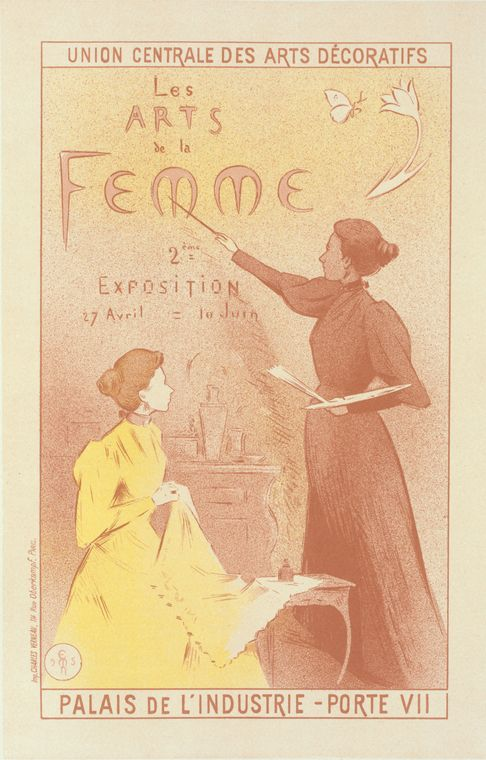
№ 58: Exposition des "Arts de la Femme" – Étienne Moreau-Nélaton (1892)

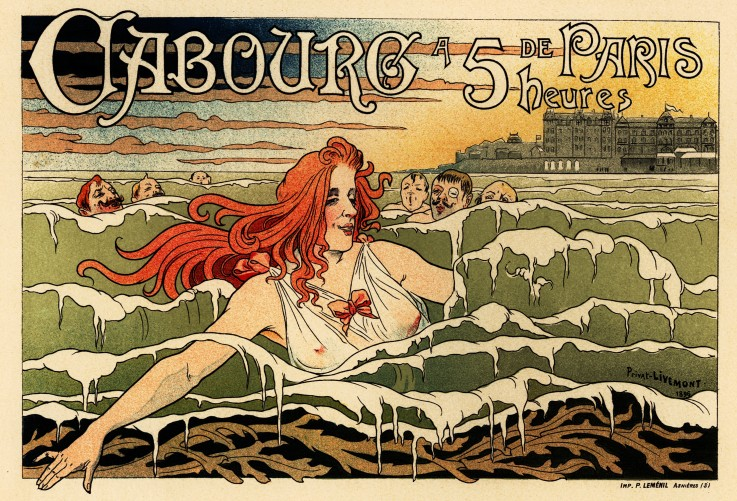
№ 88: Casino de Cabourg – T. Privat-Livemont (1897)

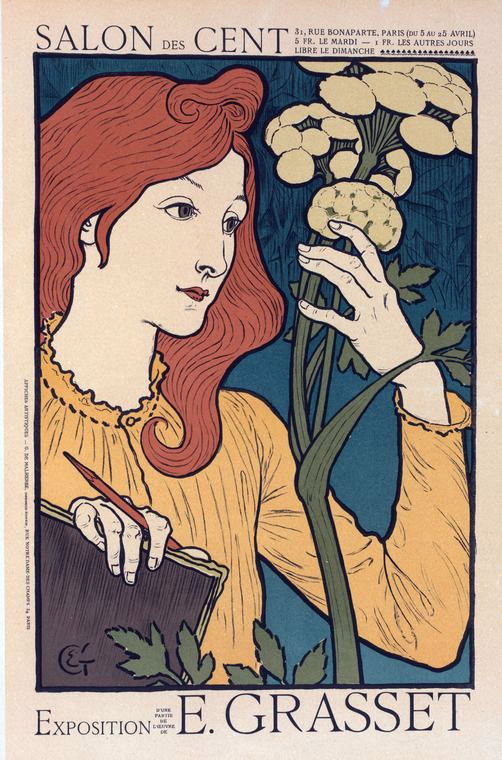
№ 98: Exposition au Salon des Cent – Eugène Grasset (1898)

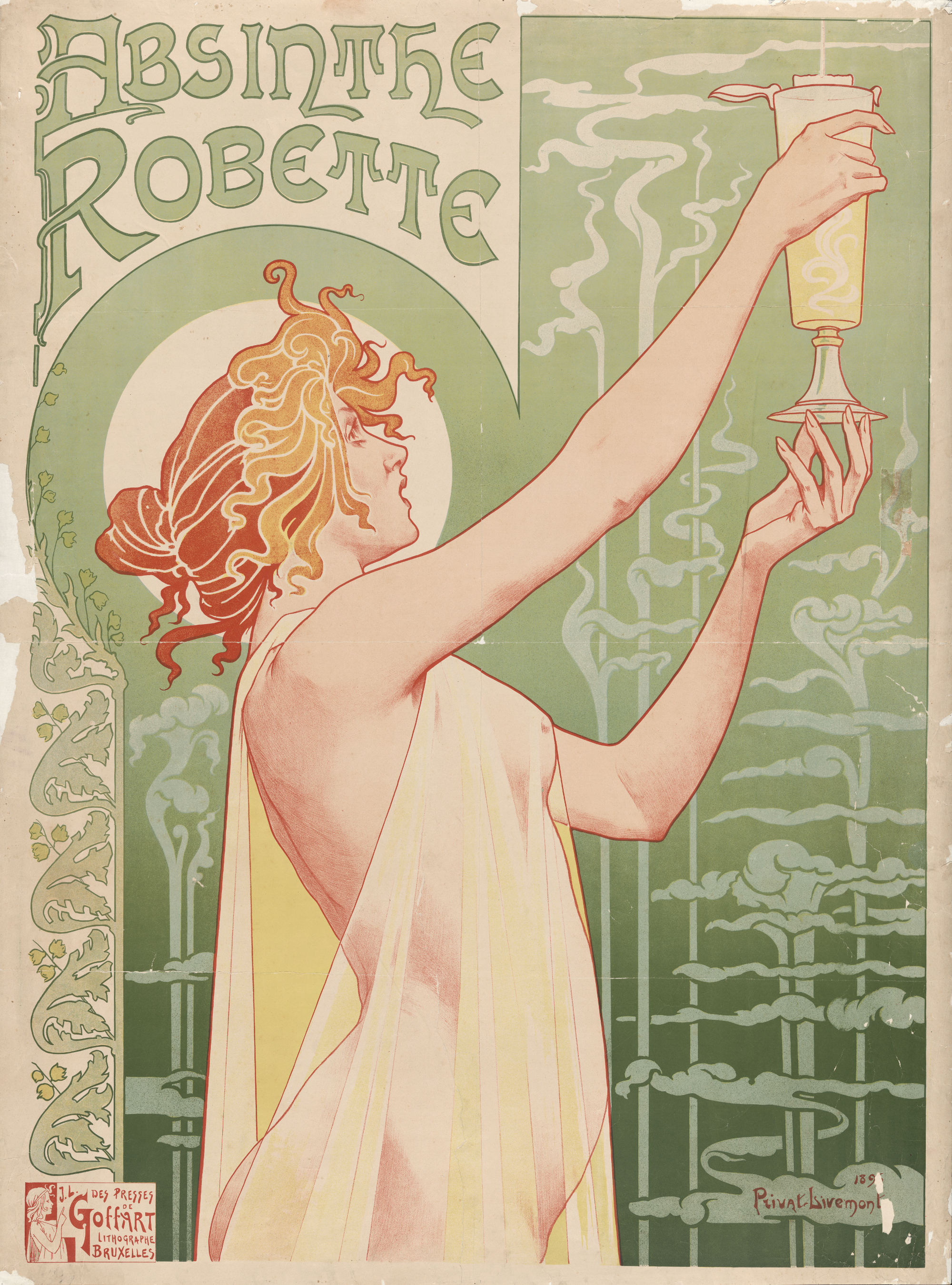
№ 104: Absinthe Robette – T. Privat-Livemont (1896)

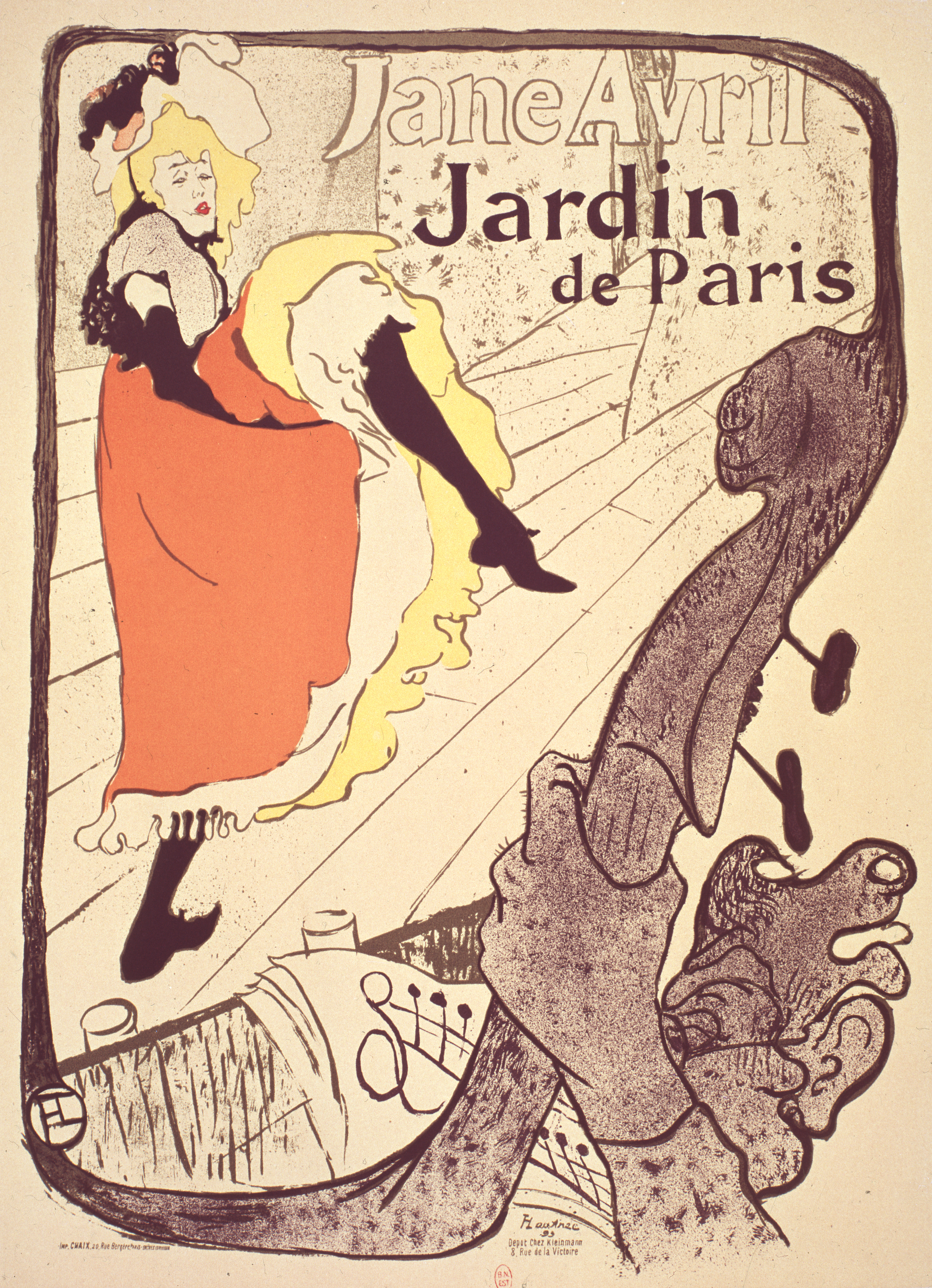
№ 110: Jane Avril – Henri de Toulouse-Lautrec (1893)

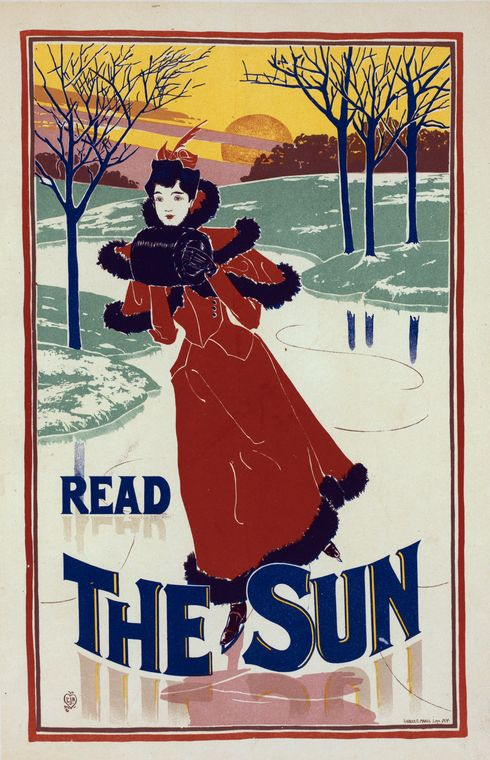
№ 200: Read The Sun – Louis Rhead (1900)

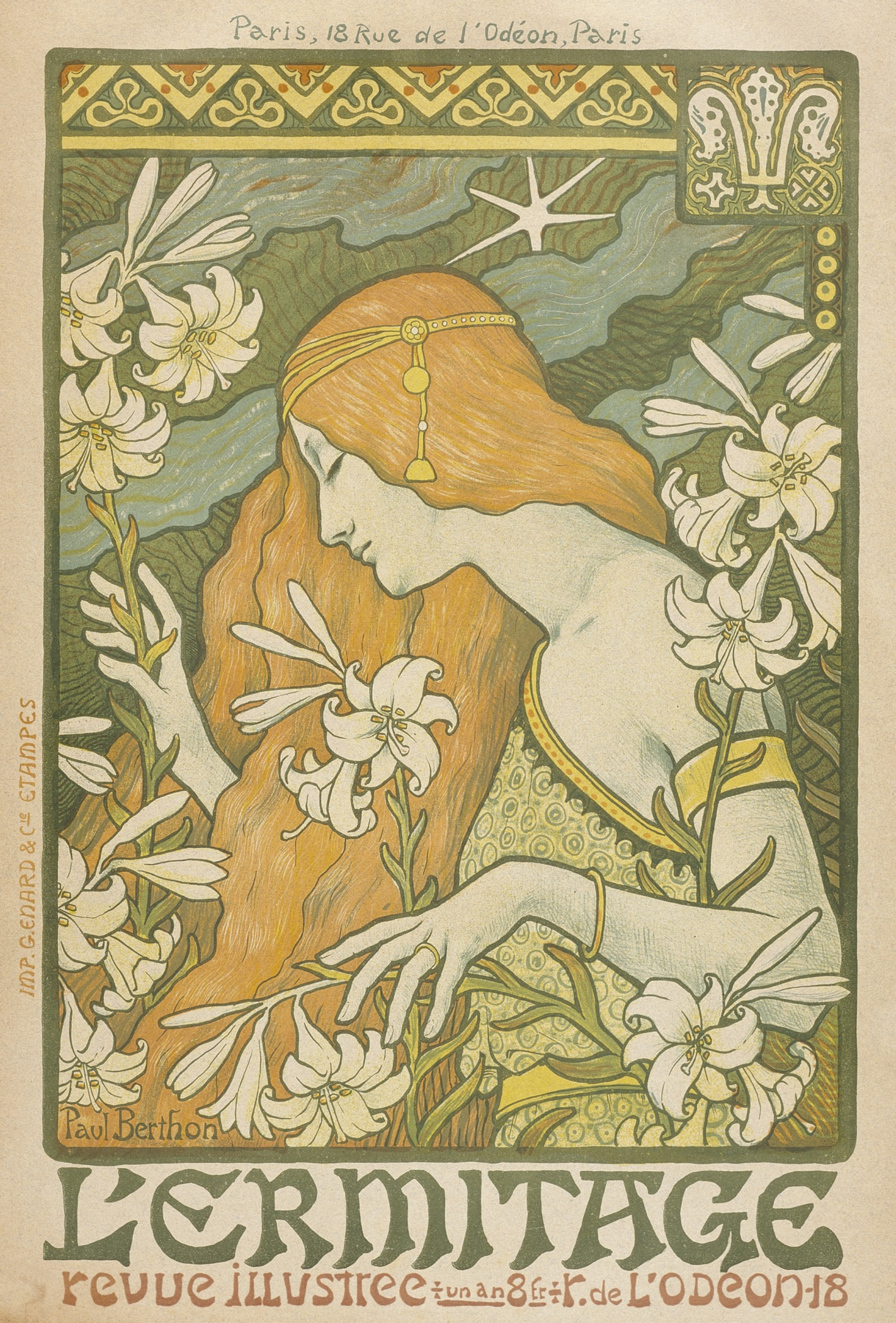
№ 227: L'Ermitage – Paul Berthon (1897)

== List of artists ==
Indexes of posters in the collection are given after names of their authors.

- Hugo d'Alesi (66, 171)
- Louis Anquetin (150)
- Anonymous (176, 236)
- Ferdinand Bac (19)
- Emmanuel Barcet (202)
- Árpád Basch (208)
- Beggarstaffs (Note: James Pryde and William Nicholson formed a duo called Beggarstaffs.) (16, 63, 107, 168, 184)
- Émile Berchmans (108)
- Paul Berthon (175, 227, cover)
- Giuseppe Boano (192)
- Pierre Bonnard (38)
- Firmin Bouisset (47)
- Louis-Maurice Boutet de Monvel (26, 106)
- Will H. Bradley (52, 152, 172)
- Caran d'Ache (70)
- William Carqueville (44, 132)
- Johann Georg van Caspel (240)
- Henri Cassiers (228)
- Frédéric-Auguste Cazals (15)
- E. Charle Lucas (155, 210, 234)
- Alexandre Charpentier (131)
- Puvis de Chavannes (54)
- Jules Chéret (1, 5, 9, 13, 17, 21, 25, 29, 33, 37, 41, 45, 49, 53, 57, 61, 65, 69, 73, 77, 81, 85, 89, 93, 97, 101, 105, 109, 113, 117, 121, 125, 129, 133, 137, 141, 145, 149, 153, 157, 161, 165, 169, 173, 177, 181, 185, 189, 193, 197, 201, 205, 209, 213, 217, 221, 225, 229, 233, 237)
- Crafty (artist)
- Adolphe Crespin (28,91)
- Maurice Denis (140)
- Auguste Donnay (59)
- Arthur Wesley Dow (36)
- Édouard Duyck (28)
- Leigh Ellis (96)
- Henri Evenepoel (116)
- Georges Fay (183, 231)
- Fernand Fernel (154, 207)
- Georges de Feure (10, 130, 146, 199)
- Otto Fischer (artist) (127)
- Paul Gustav Fischer (68, 84)
- Jean-Louis Forain (51, 186)
- Gustave Fraipont (218)
- Léo Gausson (71)
- Henry Gerbault (83)
- Alice Russell Glenny (60)
- Auguste Gorguet
- Fernand Louis Gottlob (219, 239)
- Eugène Grasset (18, 42, 50, 98, 126, 158, 174)
- Maurice Greiffenhagen (24)
- Jules Grün (103, 159, 223)
- Albert Guillaume (30, 163)
- V. Guillet.
- Dudley Hardy (4, 8, 92, 148, 216)
- Frank Hazenplug (87)
- Adolfo Hohenstein (160, 180)
- Fred Hyland (96, 120)
- Vojtěch Hynais (56)
- Henri-Gabriel Ibels (6,78, 102, 138)
- Rudolph Koller (188)
- Charles Léandre (206)
- Lucien Lefèvre (11, 55, 90, 135)
- Vincent Lorant-Heilbronn (187)
- Maximilien Luce (139)
- Giovanni Mataloni (72)
- Lucien Métivet (22)
- Georges Meunier (artist) (7, 31, 62, 147, 167)
- Henri Meunier (40, 156, 196)
- Ferdinand Mifliez Misti (86, 215)
- Étienne Moreau-Nélaton (58, 118, 162, 178, 198)
- Albert Morrow (79)
- Alfons Mucha (27, 94, 114, 144, 166, 182)
- Gaston Noury (39)
- William Nicholson (232)
- Viktor Oliva (100)
- Manuel Orazi (214)
- Pal (35)
- Maxfield Parrish (123)
- René Péan (191, 211)
- Edward Penfield (20, 115)
- Julius Mendes Price (3)
- Privat-Livemont (88, 104)
- Armand Rassenfosse (12, 224)
- Maurice Réalier-Dumas (23, 111, 226)
- Ethel Reed (99, 128)
- Fritz Rehm (124)
- Karel Reisner
- Louis Rhead (8, 200, 220)
- Alexandre de Riquer (64, 203)
- Manuel Robbe (143)
- Georges-Antoine Rochegrosse (230)
- Auguste Roedel (75, 179, 195, 235)
- Joseph Sattler (67)
- Carlos Schwabe (74)
- Théophile-Alexandre Steinlen (34, 46, 95, 134, 170, 190)
- Léopold Stevens (151)
- M. Louise Stowell (76)
- Henry Atwell Thomas (222)
- Henri de Toulouse-Lautrec (2, 82, 110, 122, 238)
- Fernand Toussaint (80)
- Félix Vallotton (119)
- Adolphe Willette (14, 43, 142, 194)
- Josef Rudolf Witzel (164)
- Charles Herbert Woodbury (32, 112)

== Auction ==
An original complete set of the five volumes was sold in 2014 for US$43,450.
