= Julius Mendes Price =

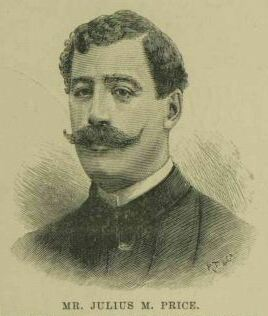
Julius Mendes Price

Julius Mendes Price FRGS (1857 – 29 September 1924) was an artist, war correspondent, explorer, traveller, journalist and caricaturist for Vanity Fair (signed "Imp", "Jmp" or "jmp"). Several of his newspaper serial reports were later published in book form.

== Biography ==
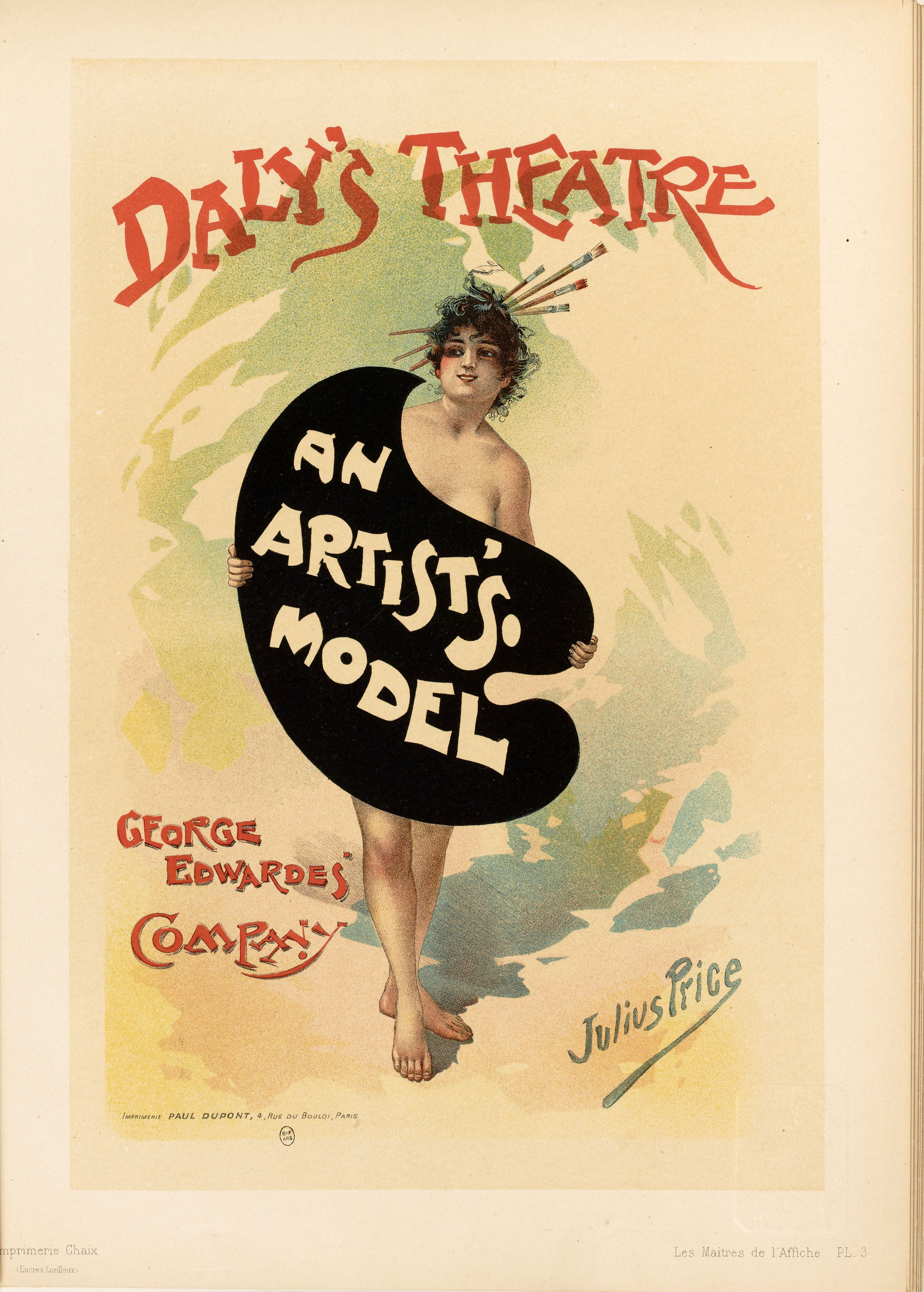
Poster published in Les Maîtres de l'Affiche

Born in St Pancras, London, to a Jewish family, he was educated at University College London and studied art in Brussels and at the École des Beaux Arts, Paris. He was a special war artist and correspondent for the Illustrated London News. For journalist purposes he enlisted as a trooper in Methuen's Horse and served in the Bechuanaland campaign 1884–1885 and continued serving with the regiment until it was disbanded. During 1890–1891 he joined an exploration expedition to open up the Nordenskiöld route to the interior of Siberia via the Kara Sea, the Arctic coast of Siberia, and along the Yenisei River; after the expedition he travelled unaccompanied by westerners across Siberia, Mongolia including the Gobi Desert, and North China to Beijing. In 1895 he went on an expedition through the Western Australian goldfields. Price was with the Greek army during the Greco-Turkish War (1897). In 1898 he went on an expedition across the Northwest Territory of Canada and down the Yukon River to the Klondike gold rush. In 1904 he acted as both special artist of the Illustrated London News and as war correspondent of the Daily Telegraph with the Russian Army during the Russo-Japanese war. During the 1890s and early 1900s he contributed art and prose to various journals including the Fortnightly Review and the Pall Mall Gazette. He exhibited at the Royal Academy and the Paris Salon; he won a medal at the Paris Exhibition 1900. At the start of WWI he was a war correspondent on the French front. In 1915–1917 he was a war artist and correspondent on the Italian front. During the Sixth Battle of the Isonzo in 1916 he was the only foreign correspondent present at the capture of Gorizia by the Italian army.

== Books by J. M. Price ==
- From the Arctic Ocean to the Yellow Sea. London: Sampson Low, Marston & Co. 1892.
- The Land of Gold: The Narrative of a Journey through the West Australian Goldfields in the Autumn of 1895 (3rd ed.). London: Sampson Low, Marston & Co. 1896.
- From Eustace to Klondike. London: Sampson Low, Marston & Co. 1898.
- Dame Fashion: Paris – London, 1786–1912. 1913.
- My Bohemian Days in London. Philadelphia: David McKay. 1913.
- My Bohemian Days in Paris. Philadelphia: David McKay. 1913.
- Price, Julius Mendes (1917). Six Months on the Italian Front: From the Stelvio to the Adriatic, 1915–1916.
- On the Path of Adventure. London: John Lane. 1919(personal narrative of the Great War, 1914–1918)
