= Henri Meunier =

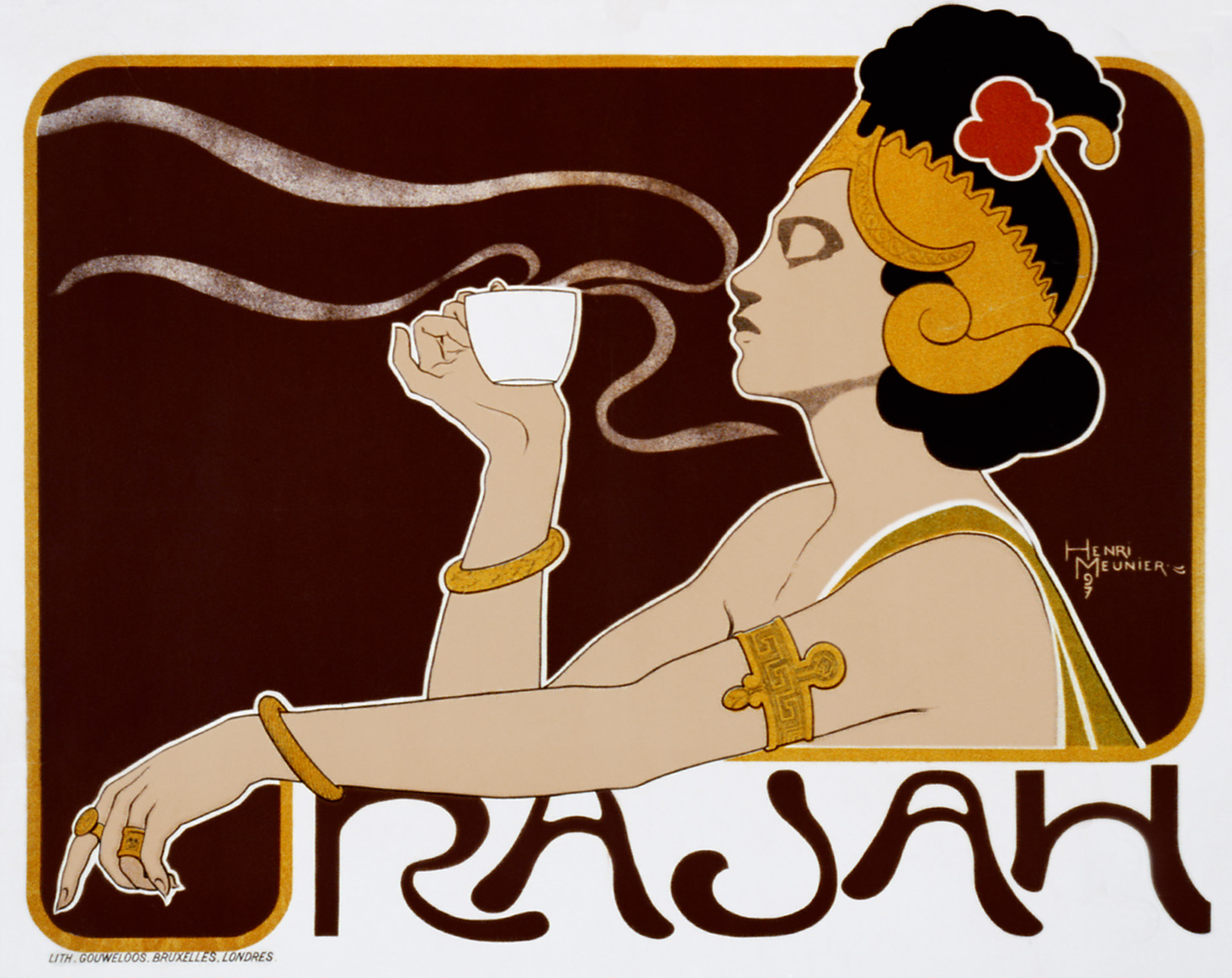
Cafe Rajah

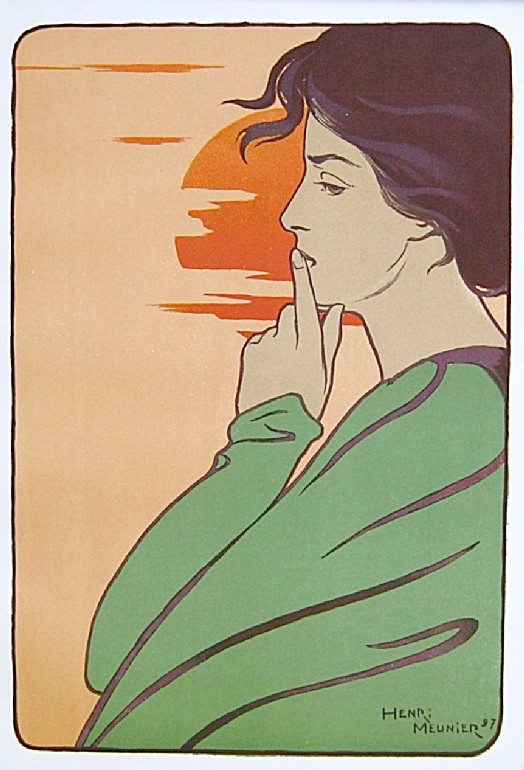
L'Heure du Silence

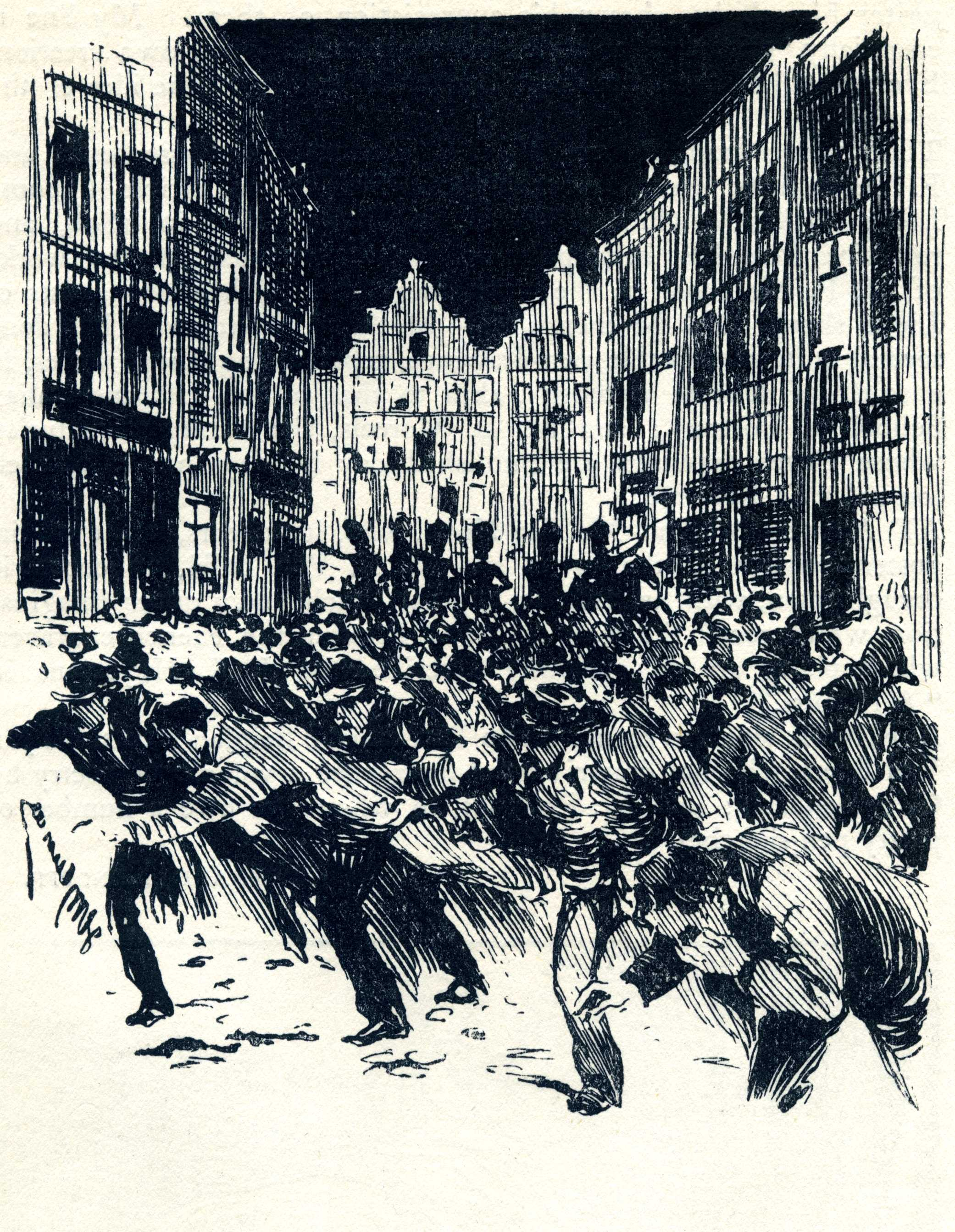
Strike in Brussels

Henri Meunier (born Henri Georges Jean Isidore Meunier; 25 July 1873 Ixelles – 8 September 1922 Brussels) was a Belgian Art Nouveau lithographer, etcher, illustrator, bookbinder and poster designer of the Belle Époque.

Henri Meunier was the son of the etcher Jean-Baptiste Meunier and was the nephew of the sculptor Constantin Meunier. He received his first training in engraving in his father's workshop. After studying at the academy in Ixelles, he diversified into printmaker, poster designer, graphic reporter and book binder. Meunier used flat colours and thick outlines, borrowed from Japanese prints, to achieve powerful images.

Many of his lithographs were published in L'Estampe Moderne, which appeared from 1897 to 1898 as a series of 24 monthly portfolios, each of 4 original lithographs, priced at 3 francs 50 centimes and printed by F. Champenois of Paris. Contributing artists included Louis John Rhead, Henri-Gabriel Ibels, Théophile Alexandre Steinlen, Adolphe-Léon Willette and Eugène Grasset. He was awarded a gold medal at the 1893 Limoges Exhibition.

== See also ==
- Maîtres de l'Affiche
