= Alice Russell Glenny =

American painter, sculptor, and graphic artist (1858–1924)

- Born: Alice Russell; 1858; Detroit, MI
- Died: 1924 (aged 65–66); Buffalo, NY
- Education: William Merritt Chase; Gustav Boulanger
- Style: Art Nouveau
- Spouse: John Clark Glenny

Alice Russell Glenny (1858–1924) was an American painter, sculptor, and graphic artist who lived and worked in Buffalo, New York. Glenny was a fixture of the thriving artistic scene in Buffalo in the early twentieth century. From 1893 to 1894 and 1903–1904, she served as president of the Buffalo Society of Artists. She studied under top teachers, such as William Merritt Chase and Gustav Boulanger, in both the United States and France, and was considered in her time to be one of the city's top artists. Today, Glenny is best remembered for her Art Nouveau posters and magazine illustrations. Her posters were featured prominently in Buffalo's Pan-American Exposition of 1901, famous for being the location of the shooting of President William McKinley. She also regularly contributed illustrations to the Buffalo-Courier Express, one of the major newspapers in Buffalo at the time.

== Early life and artistic training ==
In 1858, Alice Russell was born in Detroit, Michigan. As a young woman, she moved to New York to study art, where she met and married John Clark Glenny of Buffalo (1859–1909). The couple had two daughters. Living in New York, Glenny trained under American painter and art teacher William Merritt Chase. Traveling to Paris, Glenny also studied with French figure painter Gustav Boulanger.

== Involvement in the graphic arts ==
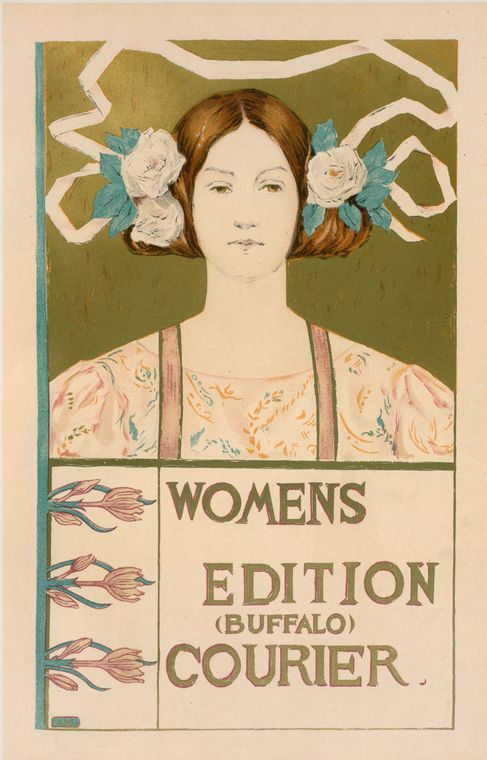
Cover: Women's Edition Buffalo Courier (1895) also published in Les Maîtres de l'Affiche

While also being a muralist and sculptor, Glenny's work as a graphic artist consisted of American Art Nouveau posters. With the development of color lithography, the production of posters was elevated worldwide from what H.C. Bunner had called a "primitive system" in which woodblocks were harshly carved allowing for an imprecision of color and shape. Color lithography provided American advertisers with the means of creating eye-catching and beautifully rendered pictures, often of fashionable women. Poster design in America was influenced by a number of emerging styles from countries such as France and Britain. French poster design, largely influenced by woodblock printing in Japan, was well received in the United States when Harper's Magazine commissioned Franco-Swiss artist Eugène Grasset to create covers in 1889, 1891, 1892, and in April 1893. Exposure to these international styles ignited a "poster craze" in which American graphic designers developed a style commonly "depicting bourgeois scenes" and utilizing more stylized lines filled with blocks of color, similar to the designs of artists such as Henri de Toulouse-Lautrec and Alphonse Mucha.

Through the proliferation of print culture as well as industrial expansion, American millionaires such as Andrew Carnegie and Henry Clay Frick began to support education and culture, enabling the U.S. to be a fertile ground for the creation of a new style of art. It was not only the upper-class who strove for cultural edification, but the also middle-class who were exposed to emerging art styles through magazines. These magazines provided a push for the opening of new museums and travel abroad. Women's Clubs were integral in establishing cultural spaces as well as publishing these art magazines.

Glenny was a part of a women's club named The Twentieth Century Club in Buffalo, New York. She, along with other poster artists such as Ethel Reed, was active in promoting the interests of American female artists. Her best known work is the cover for the Buffalo Courier: Women's Edition in 1895. Similar to other posters and covers being produced at this time, the cover displays organic and natural forms as well as the color blocking technique indicative of Art Nouveau style. Glenny's figure displays a hard face, however, uncommon of the bourgeois women depicted in posters of this time. A classical revival of sorts, the woman stares out in a stark frontality. She is softened by the flowing hair ribbon above her head and the full blooms of the flowers in her coiffured hair. While feminine in features, hairstyle, and clothing, the woman holds a firm stance in the face of women's rights.

== The Pan-American Exposition in Buffalo ==
Glenny's prints were exhibited at the 1901 Pan-American Exposition. A World's Fair, the Pan-American Exposition sought to emphasize good relations between North and South America. After much deliberation and competition, Buffalo, New York was chosen as the site of the exposition due to its large population of 350,000 people and easy access by railroad. Following the Spanish–American War, the exhibition emphasized the economic connections of the United States and Latin America, especially Cuba and Puerto Rico. Upon learning of the theme of the World's Fair, President William McKinley declared, "I shall be very glad to do anything I can for Buffalo." The Pan-American Exposition ran from May 1 through November 2, 1901.

In 1900, Glenny won a mural competition to decorate the Pan-American Exposition's New York State Building. Her painting, Blessing of the Cross by Father Milet, 1688 depicts a scene from New York history where a priest, Pierre Milet, erected a cross following the rescue of a starving garrison. The scene shows Milet, surrounded by a small group of soldiers and American Indians, blessing the raised cross while a faint figure of Christ hovers behind him. In addition to Blessing of the Cross by Father Milet, 1688, Glenny had four other works displayed in the Exposition's Exhibit of Fine Arts, including The Maid of the Mist, The Coral Harp, and The Figure of Electricity. The Exhibit boasted the largest collection of contemporary American artists such as Mary Cassatt, John Singer Sargent, and James McNeill Whistler. Many of the works exhibited emphasized the achievements of American society and technology. Glenny's cover design for the booklet, "Music at the Pan-American Exposition: Organists, Orchestras, Bands", also known as The Coral Harp demonstrates her creativity representing the idyllic, idealized female form. The coral color choice was not an accident. As part of the spectacle of the Pan-American Exposition, each building was painted a different, vibrant color, with the Temple of Music painted red and salmon.

Highly advertised, the Exposition saw several noteworthy visitors, including Thomas Edison, Vice President Theodore Roosevelt, and President McKinley. On September 6, McKinley was greeting visitors at the Temple of Music when Leon Czolgosz shot him twice. Despite the presence of the newly invented X-ray machine, doctors decided not to use it on the president for fear of possible radiation side effects. As a result of his wound in the abdomen, McKinley developed gangrene and died on September 14. The assassination cast a pall over the Exposition, and postcards depicting the Temple of Music, together with portraits of McKinley, were distributed. After the Exposition closed on November 2, the halls, including the Temple of Music, were disassembled and destroyed. The sole surviving structure from the Pan-American Exposition, the New York State Building still stands and was converted into Buffalo's Historical Society Museum where Glenny's mural remains.

== Historical significance and artistic legacy ==
Alice Russell Glenny is a historically significant figure in the realm of late nineteenth to early twentieth century American women artists as evidenced by her presence in American Art Posters of the 1890s. The exhibition catalogue includes prints and posters that are housed in the collection of the Metropolitan Museum of Art. Glenny's artwork in American Art Posters of the 1890s visually elucidates the uniqueness of the American posters when compared to French posters of the same time period. The insertion of Glenny's poster in this collection demonstrates that women artists helped shape American graphic design.

Glenny's legacy is also solidified by her inclusion in the Library of Congress in Washington D.C. Her artwork can be found in the tome American Women: A Library of Congress Guide for the Study of Women's History and Culture in the United States. Within the text, there are many examples of works by influential women who were authors, film makers, photographers and printmakers. Glenny's entry in the volume regarding "The Buffalo Courier's Women's Edition" from May 8, 1895, explicates the importance of "Women's Editions" magazines. Women's editions magazines were usually longer than the regular magazine and were marketed specifically towards women. For example, "The Buffalo Courier's Women's Edition" was "forty pages (versus the usual ten) ... [and was] promoted with colorful posters and flyers to attract readers and advertisers alike." These editions proved that women were worthy of being marketed to as consumers.

Besides Glenny's historical legacy on the national stage in the MET and Library of Congress, she was also a prominent local figure in Buffalo, NY during her lifetime. For example, she was an editor of a local magazine called Hobbies, which was put together by the Buffalo Society of Natural Sciences, circa 1920. Hobbies was a magazine that aimed to bring the "world to Buffalo." The purpose was to help middle class citizens cultivate their leisure time into worthwhile pursuits that promoted culture and erudition. Articles provided opportunities for citizens to become involved with a multitude of activities such as the study of photography, microscopic experimentation, and even anthropology. Glenny was the Art Director of this magazine. Her name can be found on the mast head. This demonstrates Glenny's continued involvement and authority regarding the arts even up until four years before her death.

== Bibliography ==
- Barney, William J. "The Art and Artists of Buffalo." Adventures in Western New York History, 25 (1979).
- Cate, Phillip D., Nancy Finlay, and David W. Kiehl, eds. American Art Posters of the 1890s in The Metropolitan Museum of Art, including the Leonard A. Lauder Collection. Ex. cat. New York: Harry N. Abrams Inc., 1987.
- Escritt, Stephen. Art Nouveau. New York: Phaidon, 2000.
- Fielding, Mantle. Dictionary of American Painters, Sculptors and Engravers. Revised Edition. Edited by Glenn B. Opitz. Poughkeepsie, NY: Apollo, 1983.
- Harvey, Sheridan, Janice Ruth, Barabara Natanson, eds. American Women: A Library of Congress Guide for the Study of Women's History and Culture in the United States. Washington: Library of Congress, 2001.
- Hosking, Arthur Nicholas, ed. The Artists Yearbook. Chicago: The Art League Publishing Association, 1905.
- Keay, Carolyn. American Posters of the Turn of the Century. New York: St. Martin's Press, 1975.
- King, Julia. The Flowering of Art Nouveau Graphics. London: Trefoil Publications, 1990.
- "Notes from the 1895 Exhibition of the Buffalo Society of Artists." The Art Interchange, vol. XXXIV, no. 1 (Jan., 1895).
- Pan-American Exposition, Buffalo May 1 to November 1, 1901. Its Purpose and Plan. Buffalo: the Courier Company, 1901.
- University at Buffalo Libraries, "Pan-American Exhibition of 1901." University at Buffalo. Last modified 2017. http://library.buffalo.edu/pan-am/exposition/.
- Weierheiser, Ruth V., ed. Hobbies: Buffalo Society of Natural Sciences Volume 1, Number 3 (July 1920): 3.
