= Paul Gustav Fischer =

Danish painter (1860–1934)

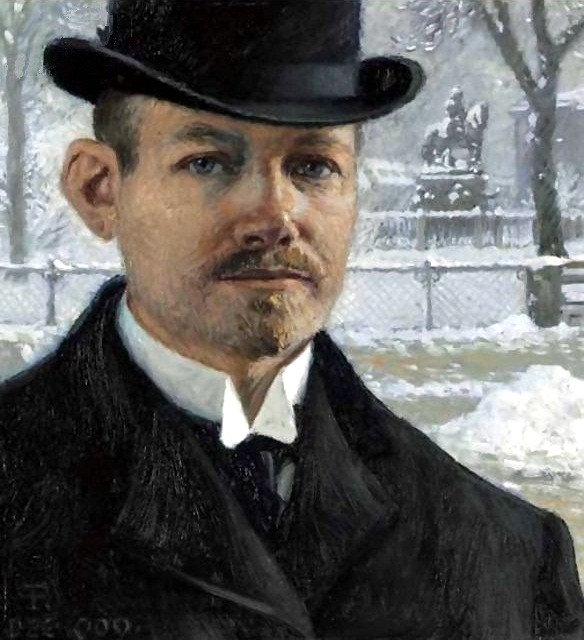
Self-portrait (1909)

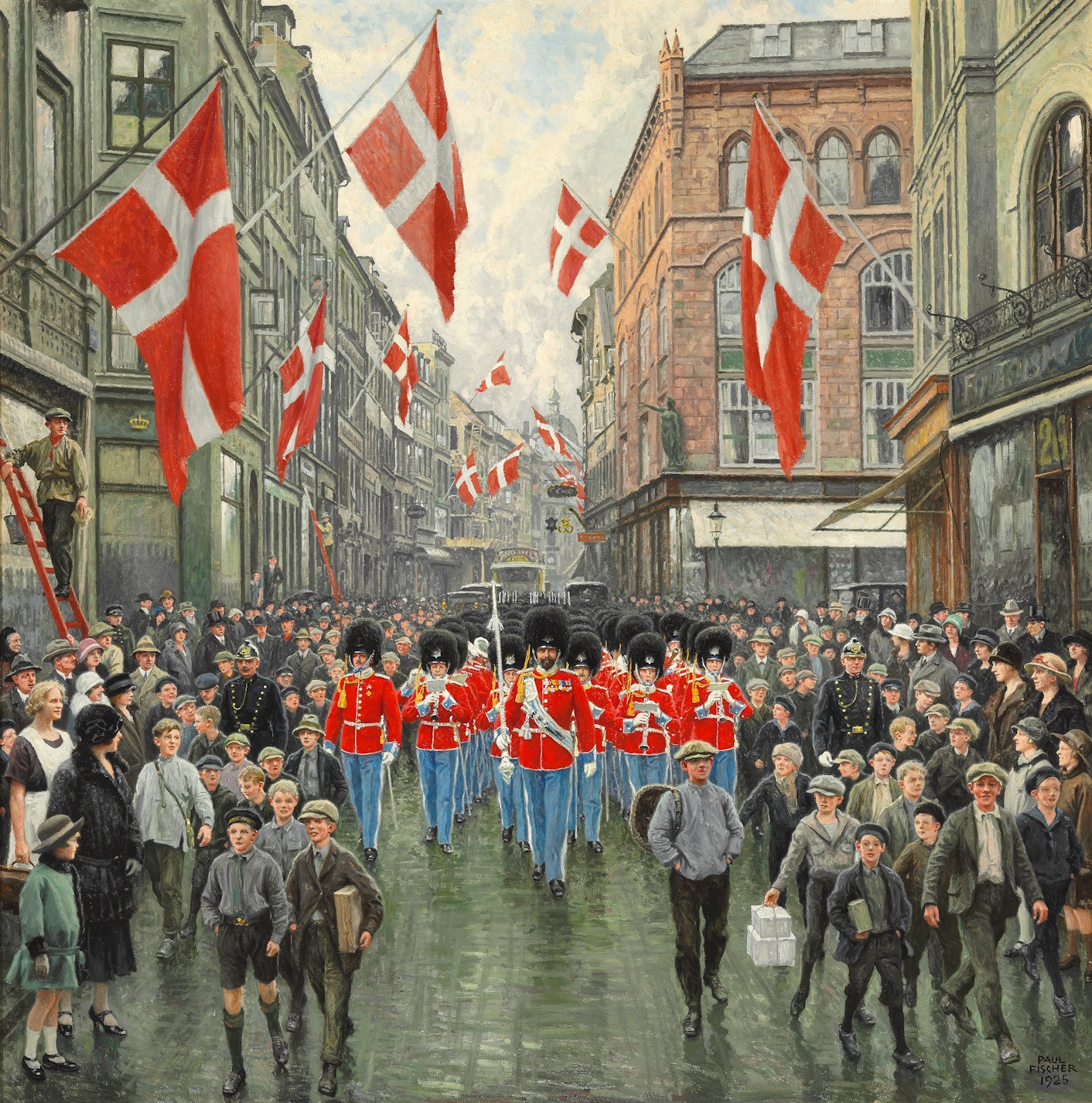
Kongens Fødselsdag (1925)

Paul Gustav Fischer (22 July 1860 – 5 January 1934) was a Danish painter.

== Biography ==
Paul Fischer was born in Copenhagen, Denmark. He belonged to the fourth generation of a Jewish family which originally came from Poland. He was the son of Philip August Fischer (1817–1907) and Gustafva Albertina Svedgren (1827–1883). The family was upper middle class; His father had started as a painter, but later succeeded in the business of manufacturing paints and lacquers.

His formal art education lasted only a short time in his mid teens when he spent two years at the Royal Danish Academy of Art in Copenhagen. Fischer began to paint when he was still young, guided by his father. He worked from 1878–88 at the father's factory and exhibited regularly at Charlottenborg Spring Exhibition 1884–1902.

It was thanks to a painting he had published in Ude og Hjemme that his reputation began to evolve as he came in contact with young Danish naturalists. His earlier paintings depict city life. For this reason, he has been called "Copenhagen's painter" (Københavns maler). After a stay in Paris from 1891–1895, his colours became richer and lighter. It was not long before Fischer gained fame as a painter of cities, not just Copenhagen, but scenes from Scandinavia, Italy and Germany, reaching his zenith between 1890 and 1910.

He benefited from contemporaries in Norway and Sweden, especially Carl Larsson. Around this time, he also painted bright, sunny bathing scenes, some with nude women, and developed an interest in posters, inspired by Théophile Steinlen and Henri de Toulouse-Lautrec.

During the period when he actively painted, Danish art was dominated by Laurits Tuxen. Despite Fischer's lack of critical recognition during his lifetime, his art sold well. One major event in which he succeeded over Tuxen was when Sweden transferred the sovereignty of Norway back to the Norwegians – Fischer rather than Tuxen got the commission from the King of Norway to paint the event.

== Personal life ==
Fischer was first married in 1886 to Dagny Grønneberg (1867–1920) The marriage was dissolved. He was married a second time in 1914 with concert singer Martha Vilhelmine Jensen (1888–1966). He died in Gentofte during 1934.

== Gallery ==
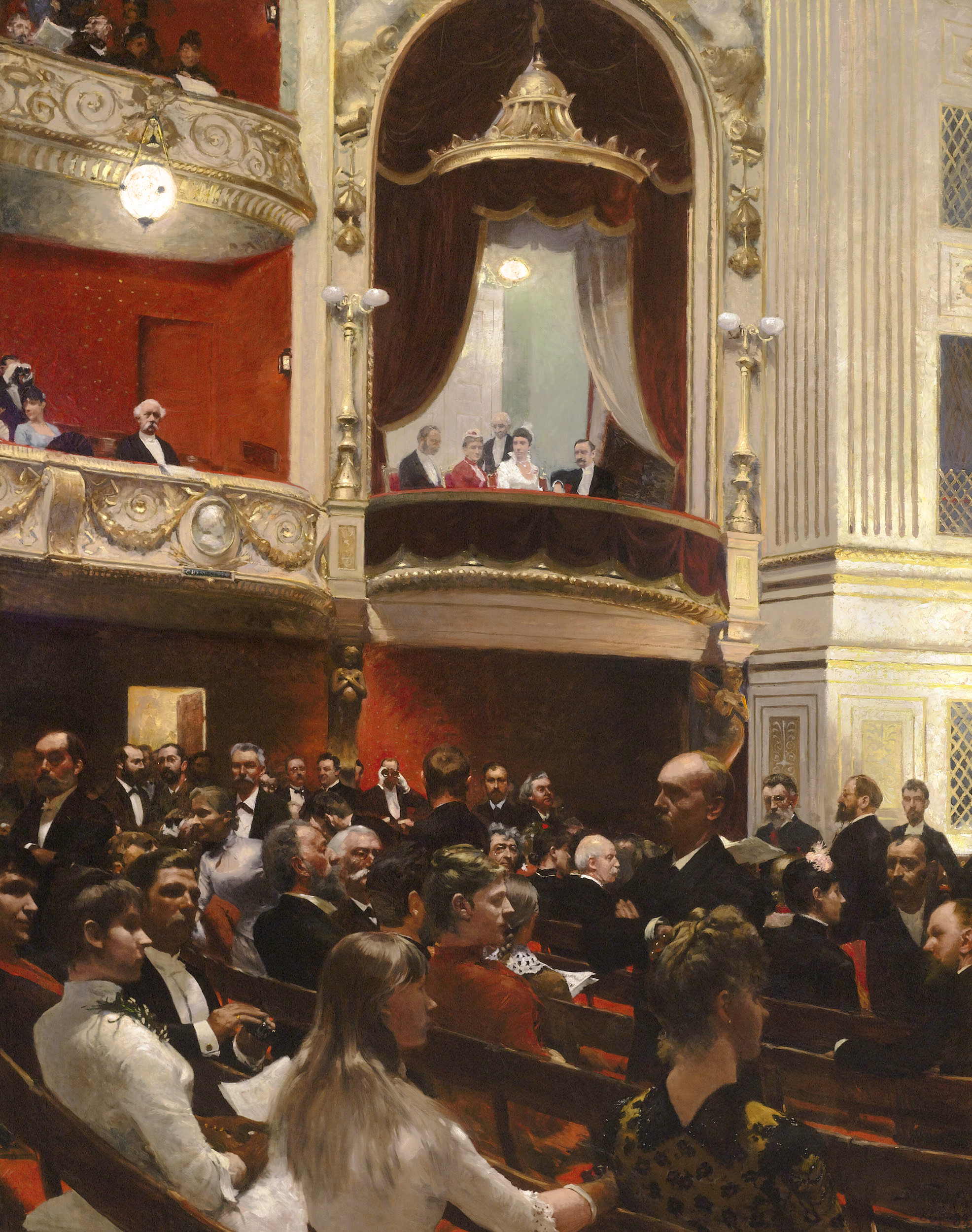
An Evening at the Royal Theatre (1887–88)

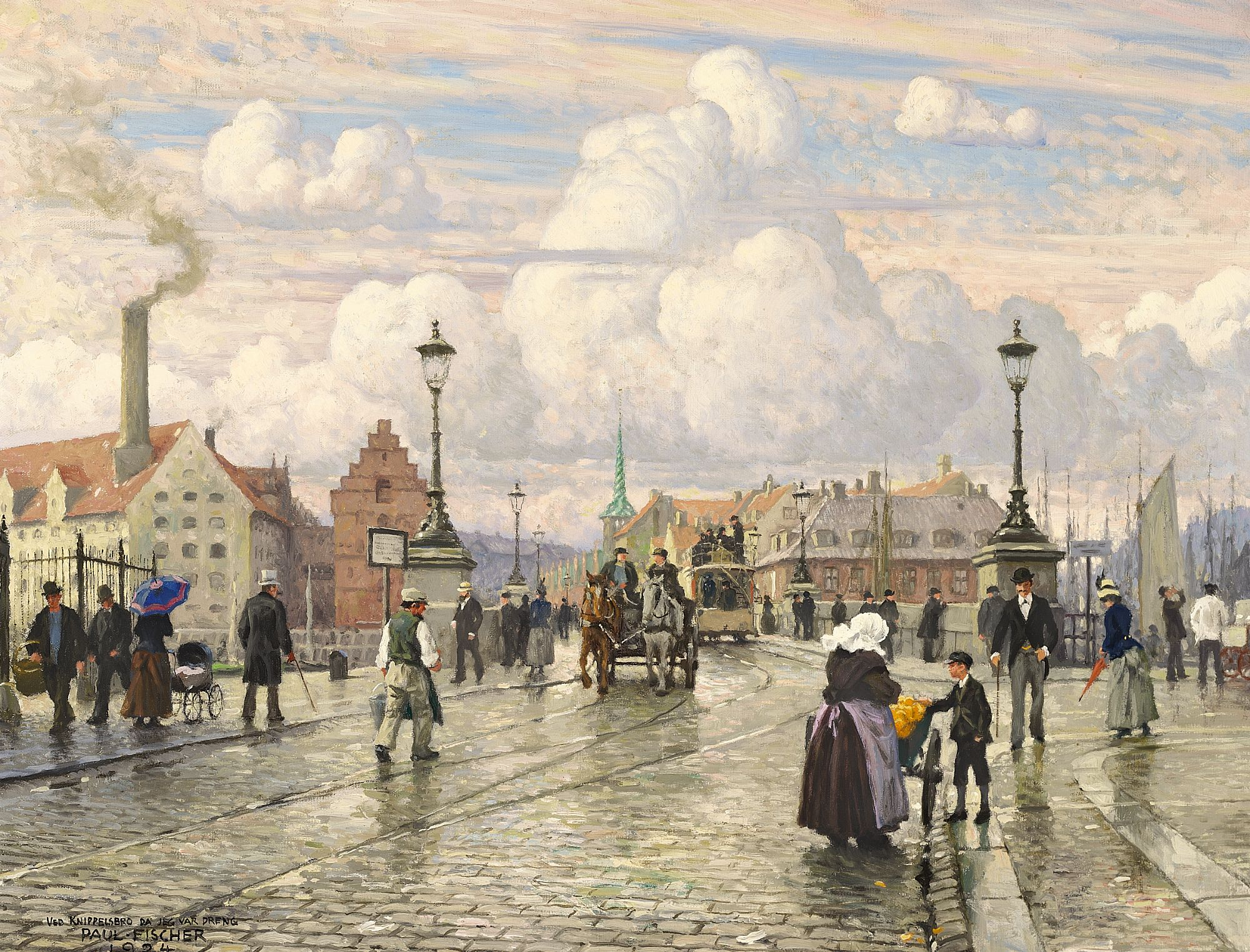
Scene from Knippelsbro (1924)

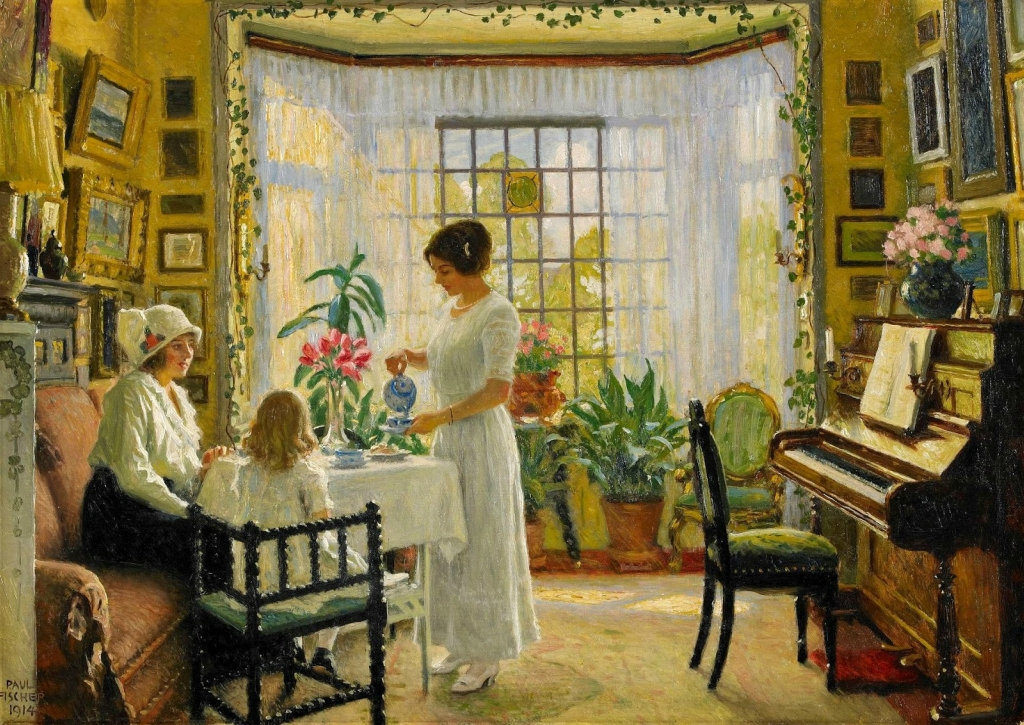
Interieur (1914)

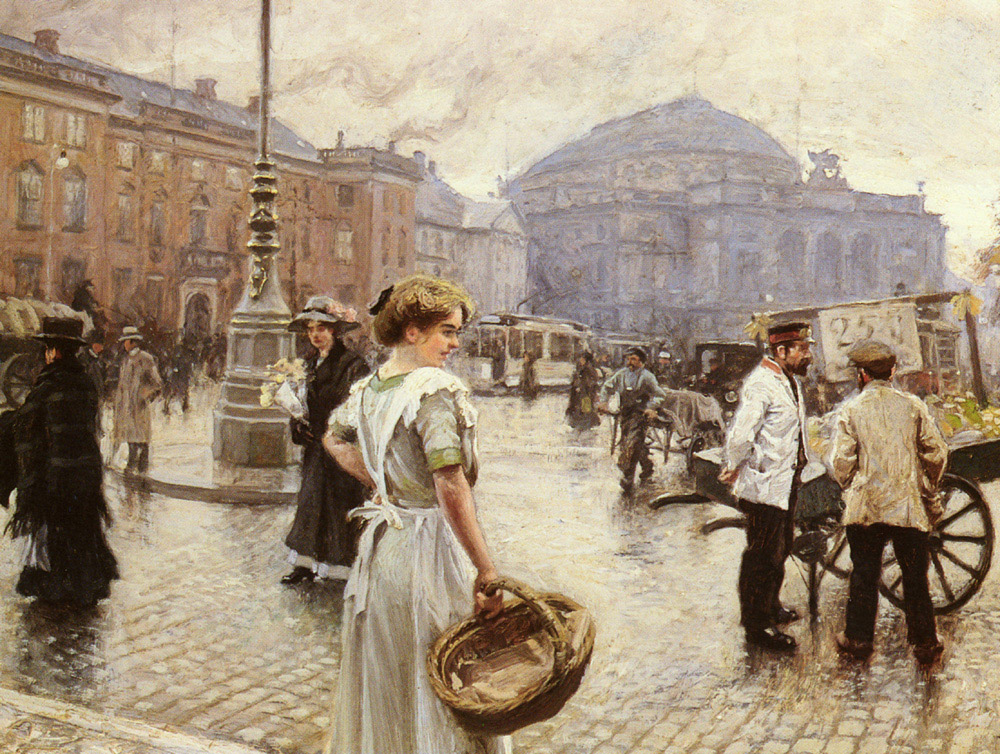
A View Of Kongens Nytorv

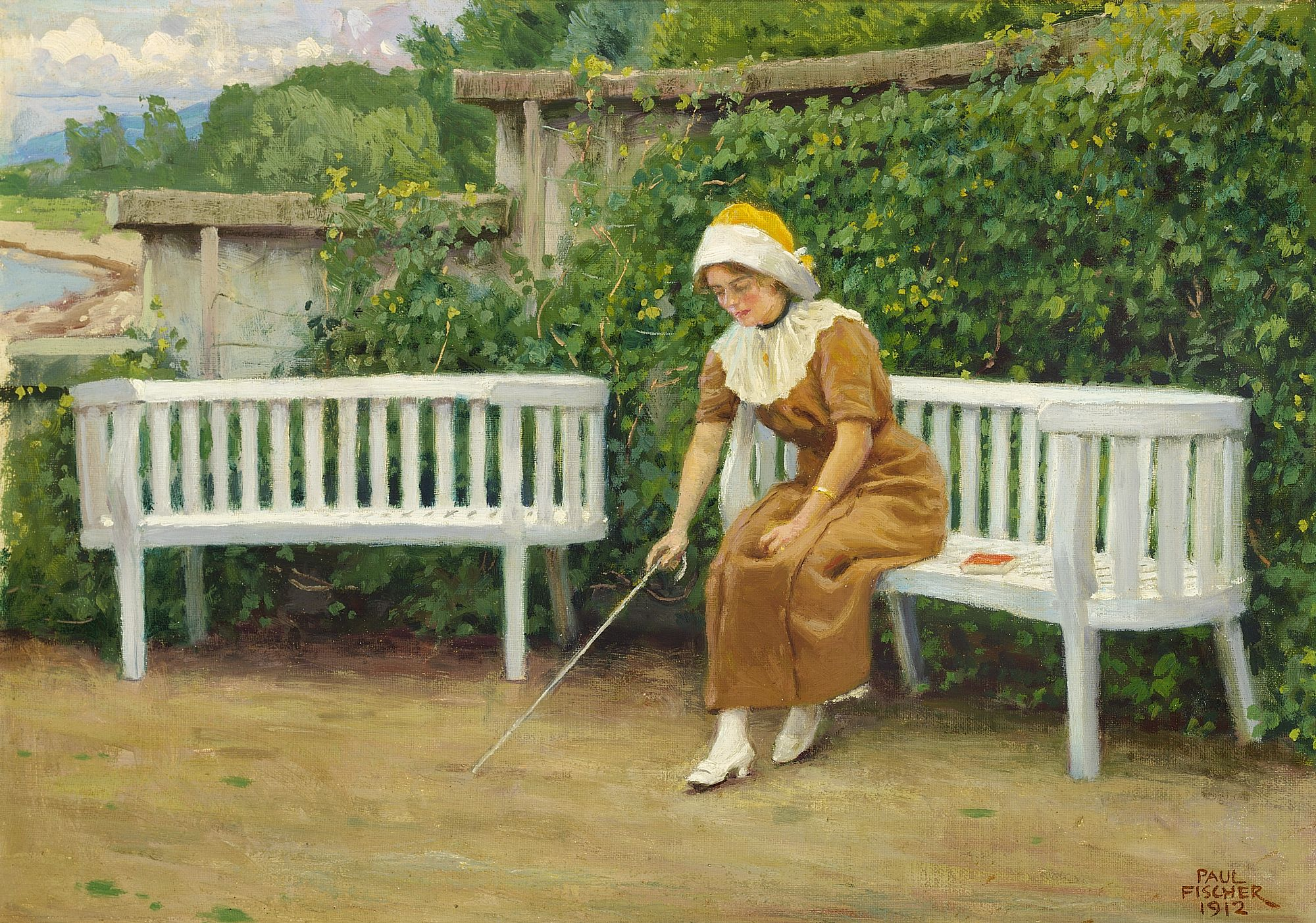
In Thoughts (1912)

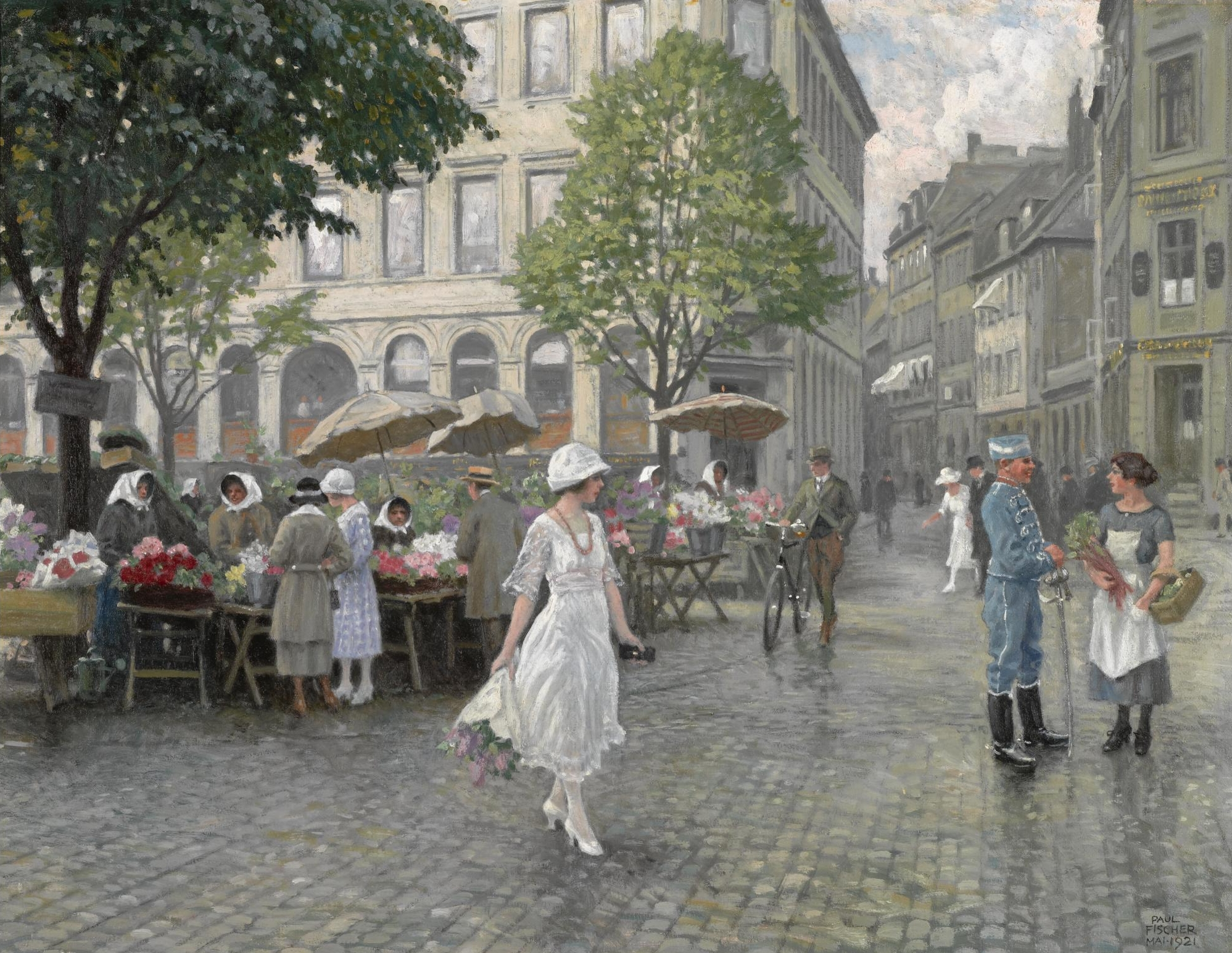
Højbro Plads, København (1921)

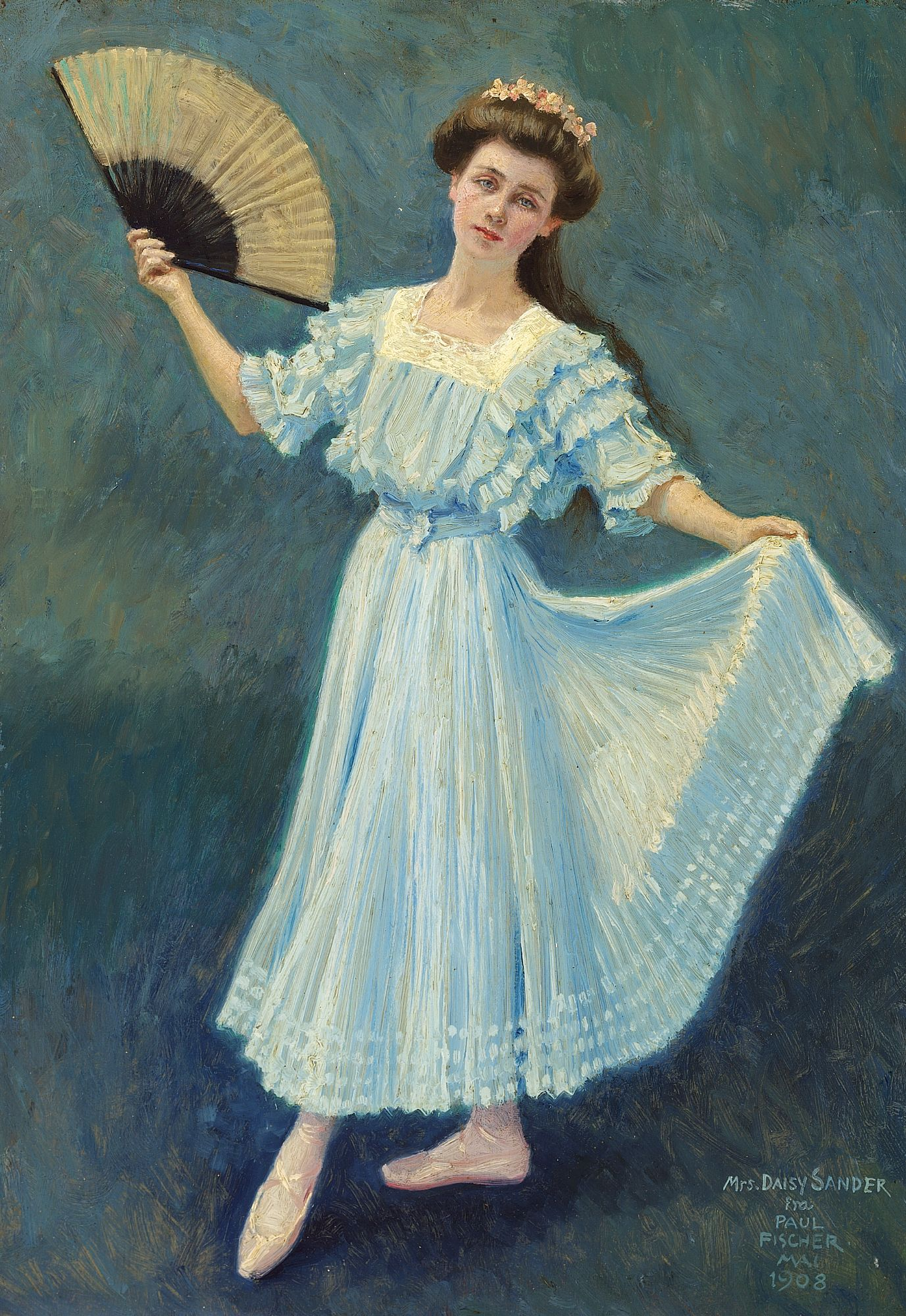
A Ballerina (1908)

== See also ==
- Art of Denmark
- Les Maîtres de l'Affiche
