= Jules Chéret =

French painter and lithographer (1836–1932)

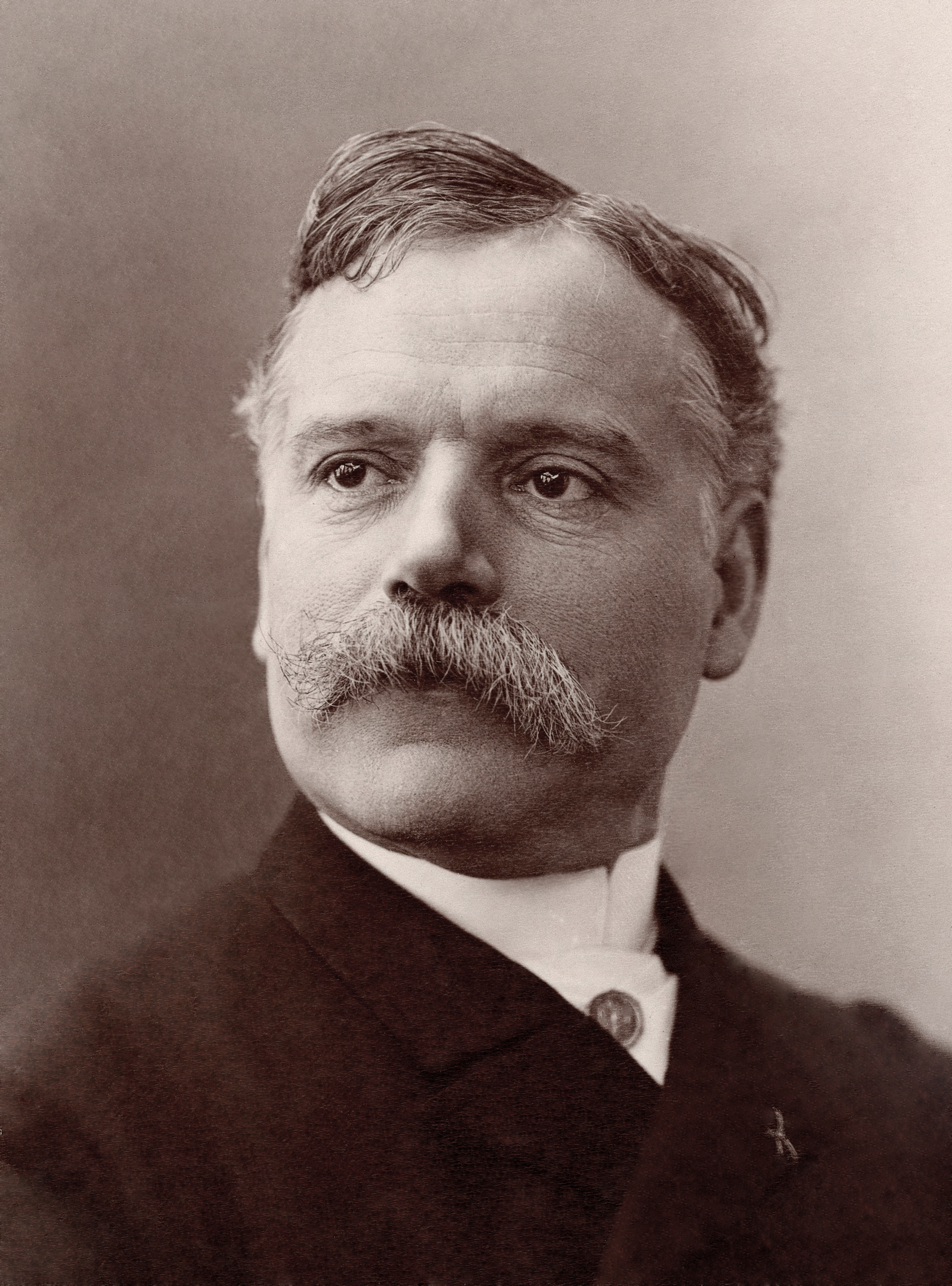
- Jules Chéret photographed by Nadar, c. 1900
- Born: Jules Chéret; 31 May 1836; Paris, France
- Died: 23 September 1932 (aged 96); Nice, France
- Education: École Nationale de Dessin
- Known for: Lithography, Poster art
- Movement: Art Nouveau
- Awards: Légion d'honneur

Jules Chéret (French: [ʒyl ʃeʁɛ]; 31 May 1836 – 23 September 1932) was a French painter and lithographer who became a master of Belle Époque poster art. He has been called the father of the modern poster.

== Early life and career ==
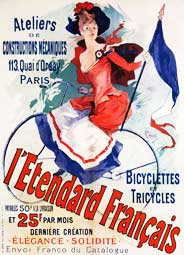
L'Etendard Français, Chéret's 1891 poster for the bicycle shop on the Quai d'Orsay

Born in Paris to a poor but creative family of artisans, Chéret had a very limited education. At age thirteen, he began a three-year apprenticeship with a lithographer and then his interest in painting led him to take an art course at the École Nationale de Dessin. Like most other fledgling artists, Chéret studied the techniques of various artists, past and present, by visiting Paris museums.

From 1859 to 1866, he was trained in lithography in London, England, where he was strongly influenced by the British approach to poster design and printing. On returning to France, Chéret created vivid poster ads for the cabarets, music halls, and theaters such as the Eldorado, the Olympia, the Folies Bergère, Théâtre de l'Opéra, the Alcazar d'Été, the Café des Ambassadeurs and the Moulin Rouge. He created posters and illustrations for the satirical weekly Le Courrier français.

At some point after his return to France, Chéret founded a lithography company that he later sold to Imprimerie Chaix in 1881.

According to the poster collector Ernest Maindron, who wrote the first essay about the illustrated poster in the Gazette des Beaux-Arts in 1884, and later published the first book on the subject (Les Affiches Illustrees) in 1886, Chéret, along with the brothers Léon and Alfred Choubrac, was among the pioneers of the illustrated poster. In the early 1870s, Chéret and the Choubrac brothers reduced the cost of colour lithography introducing technical advances.

== Growing popularity ==
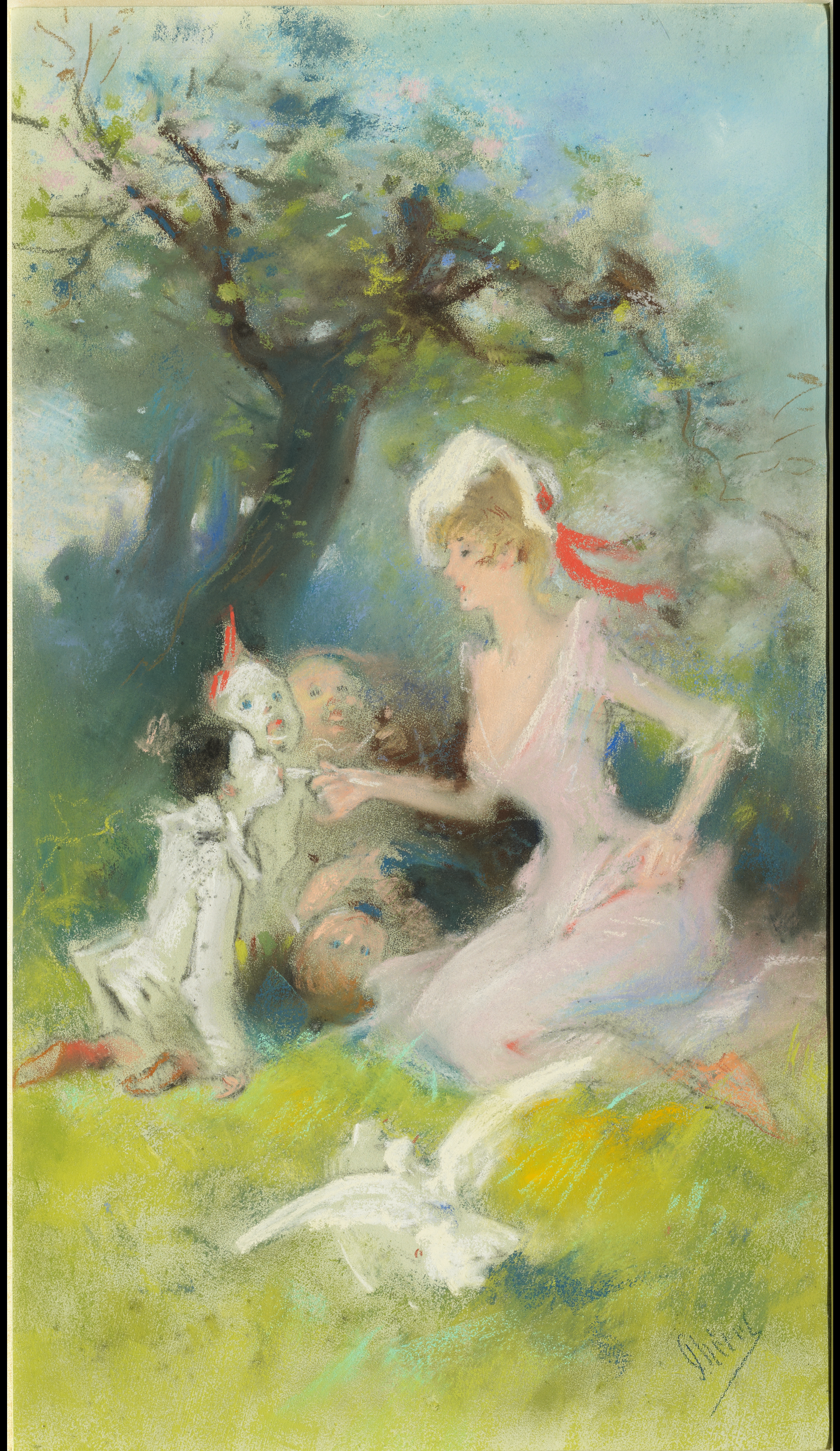
Feeding the Clowns, before 1890, pastel on beige wove paper. Clark Art Institute

His works were influenced by the scenes of frivolity depicted in the works of Rococo artists such as Jean-Honoré Fragonard and Antoine Watteau. So much in demand was he, that he expanded his business to providing advertisements for the plays of touring troupes, municipal festivals, and then for beverages and liquors, perfumes, soaps, cosmetics and pharmaceutical products. Eventually he became a major advertising force, adding the railroad companies and a number of manufacturing businesses to his client list.

Chéret engaged with modernity while keeping the aesthetics established by high arts. This changed the public's opinion of advertisement, something that was thought of as a nuisance by some.

As his work became more popular and his large posters displaying modestly free-spirited women found a larger audience, pundits began calling him the "father of the women's liberation." Women then had previously been depicted in art as prostitutes or puritans. The women of Chéret's posters, joyous, elegant and lively—'Cherettes', as they were popularly called—were neither. It was freeing for the women of Paris, and heralded a noticeably more open atmosphere in Paris where women were able to engage in formerly taboo activities, such as wearing low-cut bodices and smoking in public. These 'Cherettes' were widely seen and recognised, and a writer of the time said "It is difficult to conceive of Paris without its 'Cheréts' (sic)."

In 1895, Chéret created the Maîtres de l'Affiche collection, a significant art publication of smaller sized reproductions featuring the best works of ninety-seven Parisian artists. His success inspired an industry that saw the emergence of a new generation of poster designers and painters such as Charles Gesmar and Henri de Toulouse-Lautrec. One of his students was Georges de Feure.

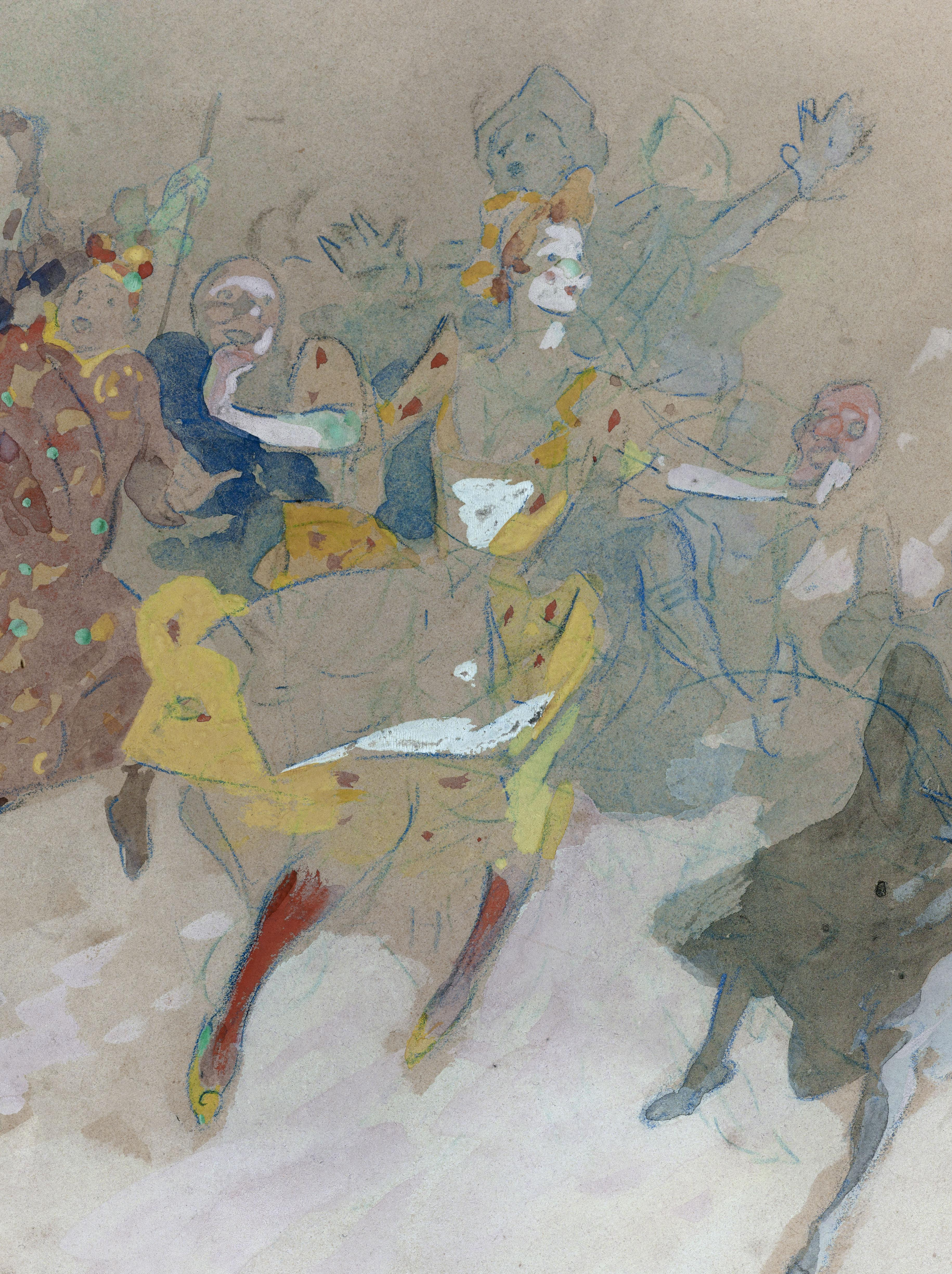
Sketch for The Comedy, one of the five murals Chéret created for the Hôtel de Ville.

The same year, Chéret was invited to add to the walls of Paris’ Hôtel de Ville. Keeping in line with his poster aesthetics, Chéret painted The Joys of Life, a series of murals that brought his modern poster aesthetic into the previously reserved setting of nationalistic decoration. Four of the five narratives depict performance arts: two types of theater, dance and music. The fifth is named Toys.

In his old age Chéret retired to the pleasant climate of the French Riviera at Nice. He died in 1932 at the age of ninety-six and was interred in the Cimetière Saint-Vincent in the Montmartre quarter of Paris.

== Legacy ==
He was awarded the Légion d'honneur by the French Government in 1890 for his outstanding contributions to the graphic arts. Although his paintings earned him a certain respect, it was his work creating advertising posters, taken on just to pay his bills but eventually his dedication, for which he is remembered today. The award was given to him for creating an art form that meets the needs of Commerce and industry. Edmond de Goncourt recognized Chéret as "the first painter of the Paris wall, the inventor of the art in the poster" when he toasted the artist at the banquet held in his honor.

In 1933 he was honoured with a posthumous exhibition of his work at the prestigious Salon d'Automne in Paris. Over the years, Chéret's posters became much sought after by collectors from around the world.

== Selected works ==
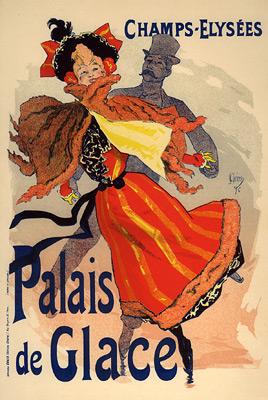
Palais des Glaces

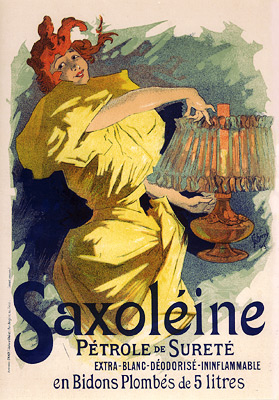
Saxoléine,
Pétrole de sureté

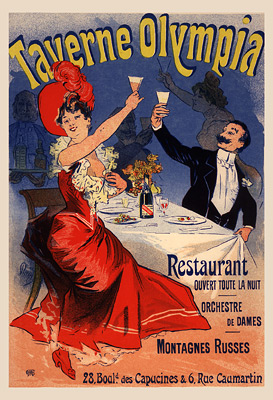
Taverne Olympia, Restaurant

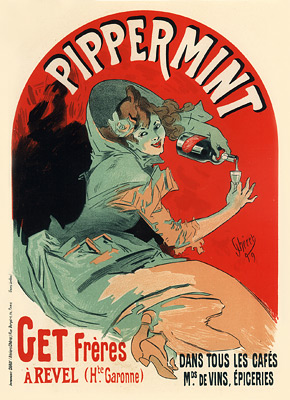
Pippermint,
Get Frères

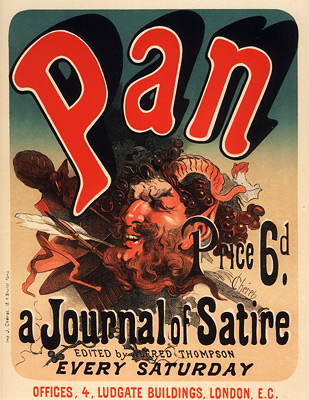
Pan,
a Journal of Satire

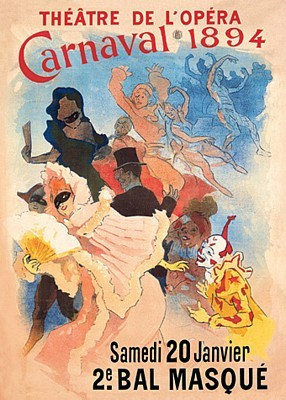
Théâtre de l'Opéra,
Carnaval 1894

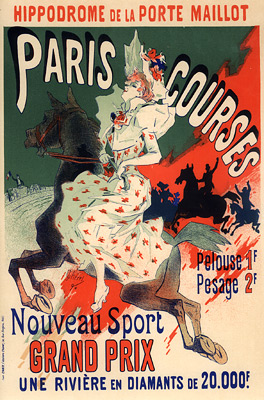
Hippodrome de la Porte Maillot, Paris Courses

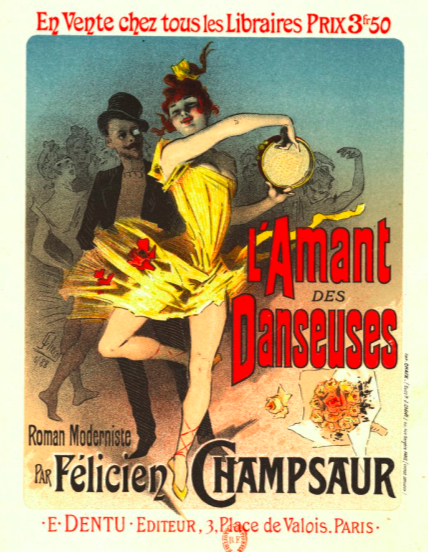
L'Amant des Danseuses Roman Moderniste
par Félicien Champsaur

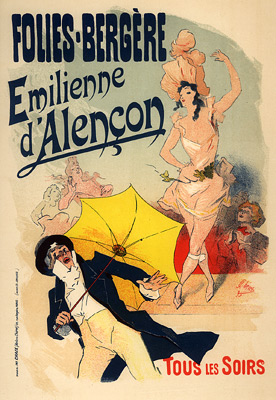
Folies Bergère,
Émilienne d'Alençon

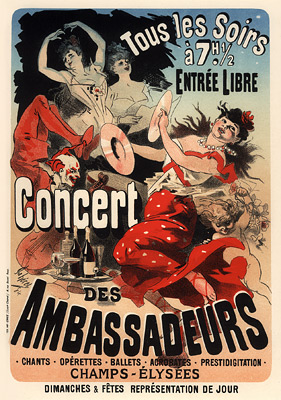
Concert des Ambassadeurs,
Champs-Élysées

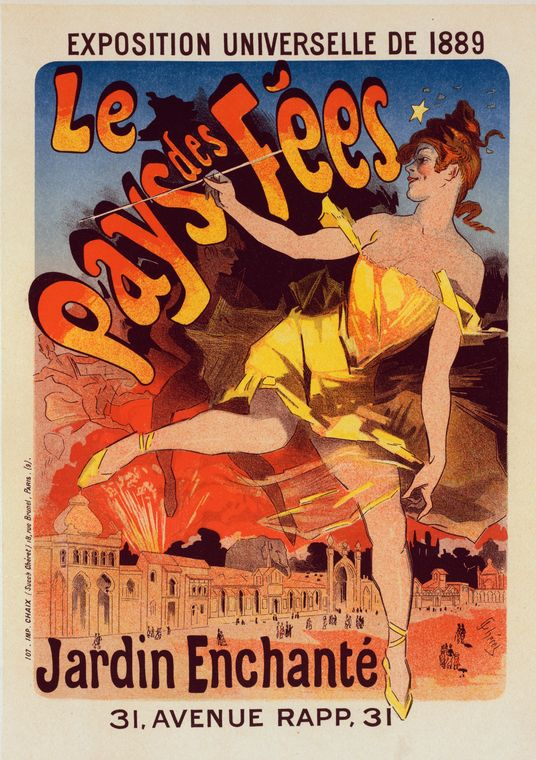
Exposition Universelle 1889, Le Pays des Feés

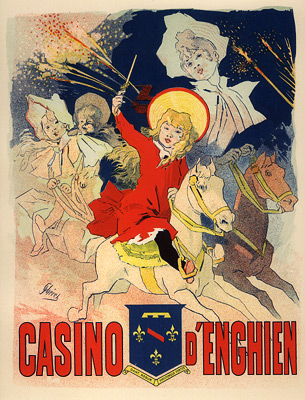
Casino d'Enghien

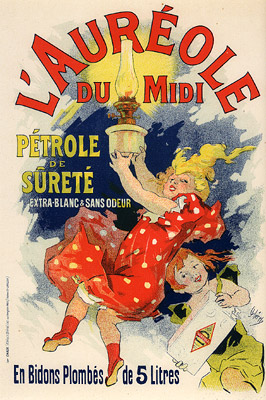
L´Aureole du Midi,
Pétrole de sureté

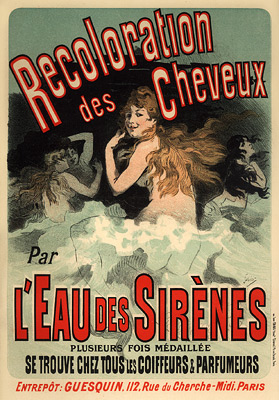
Recoloration des Cheveux par l'Eau des Sirènes

== See also ==
- Les Maîtres de l'Affiche
- Musée des Beaux-Arts de Nice
- Poster

== Sources ==
- (in French) Maindron, Ernest (1896). Les affiches Illustrées (1886–1895), Paris: G. Boudet
- Verhagen, Marcus, The poster in Fin-de-Siècle Paris: "That Mobile and Degenerate Art", in: Charney, Leo & Vanessa R. Schwartz (eds.) (1995). Cinema and the Invention of Modern Life, Berkeley (CA): University of California Press, ISBN 9780520201125
