= Henri Privat-Livemont =

Belgian artist (1861–1936)

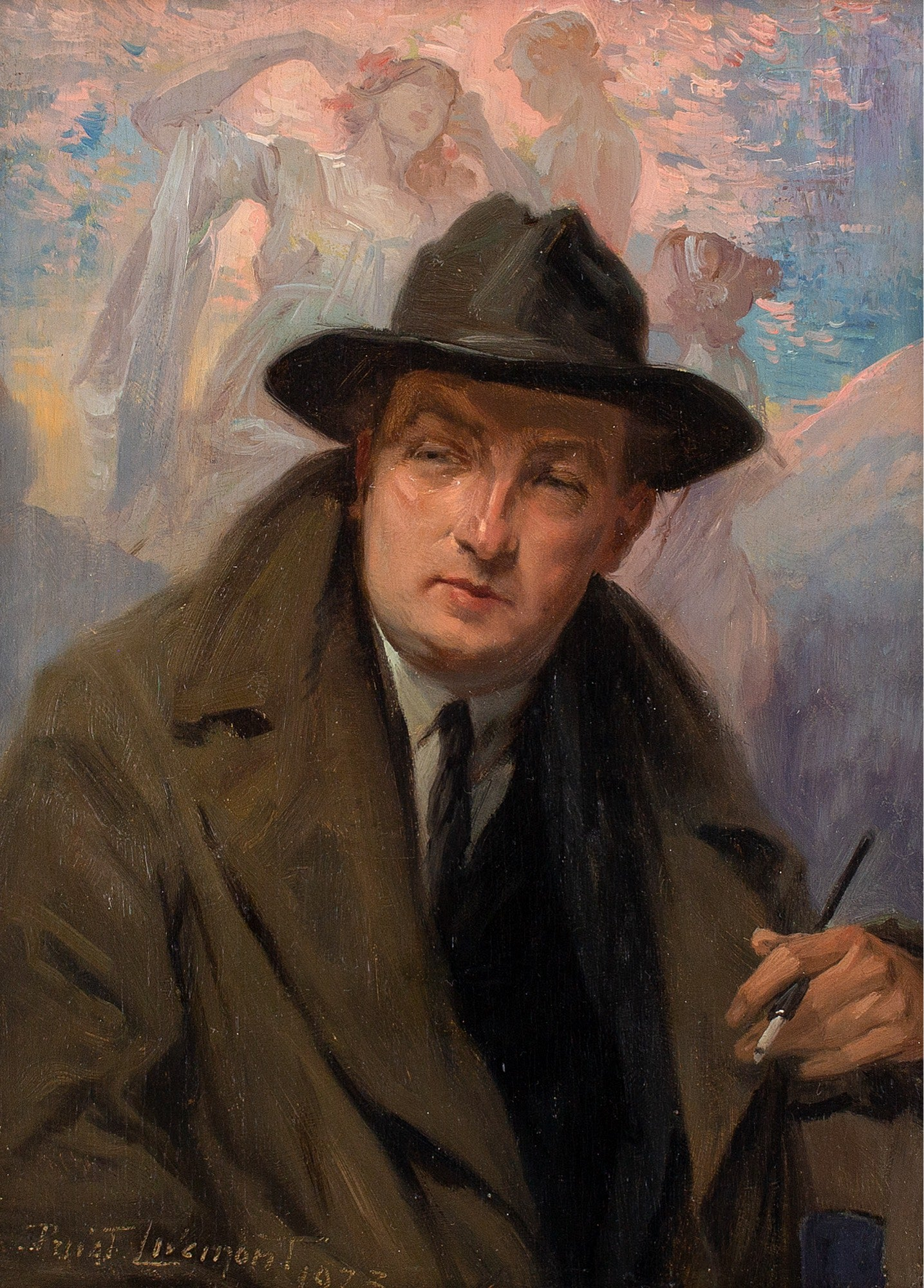
Self-portrait by Privat Livemont, 1912

Bitter Oriental (1897) for distillery De Schoonen, Brussels (from the collection of the Jenevermuseum, Hasselt)

Privat Antoine Théodore Livemont (1861–1936) was a Belgian Symbolist painter and Art Nouveau decorator who sometimes worked under the name T. Privat-Livemont.

== Life ==
Livemont was born in Schaerbeek, Brussels, on 9 October 1861, to Henri Livemont and Marie Catherine Richard. From the age of 13 he studied drawing at the academy of Saint-Josse-ten-Noode under Louis Hendrickx. He graduated at the top of his class in 1883 and was awarded a government bursary to spend time in Paris, where he remained 1883–1889, working and studying in the studios of Lemaire (for the interior decoration of the Hôtel de Ville), and of Lavastre and Duvignaud (painting stage sets for the Opéra Garnier and the Comédie Française). He exhibited in the Paris Salon in 1886 and 1887.

On 23 July 1889 he married Madeleine Brown, and shortly after marriage returned to Schaarbeek to work as a painter and interior designer, establishing his own studio in 1890. During this period he also produced a number of portraits. From 1891 he was also a professor of drawing and ornamental design at the industrial design school in Schaarbeek, teaching alongside Adolphe Crespin, Paul Hankar and Paul Saintenoy. From 1893 to 1902 he painted a number of grand ceilings in theatres, commercial premises, and Ostend casino, most of which have subsequently been lost. He was regarded as a Symbolist, but became better known for his posters in Art Nouveau style, most famously that for the Brussels International Exposition (1897). Two of his posters, for Absinthe Robette and the Casino de Cabourg, were published in Les Maîtres de l'Affiche. Between 1900 and 1921 he painted a number of murals for public buildings, mostly in and around Brussels but including the provincial government house for Limburg in Hasselt. During the First World War he produced a series of caricatures of German occupiers. He retired from teaching in 1934, and died on 4 October 1936.

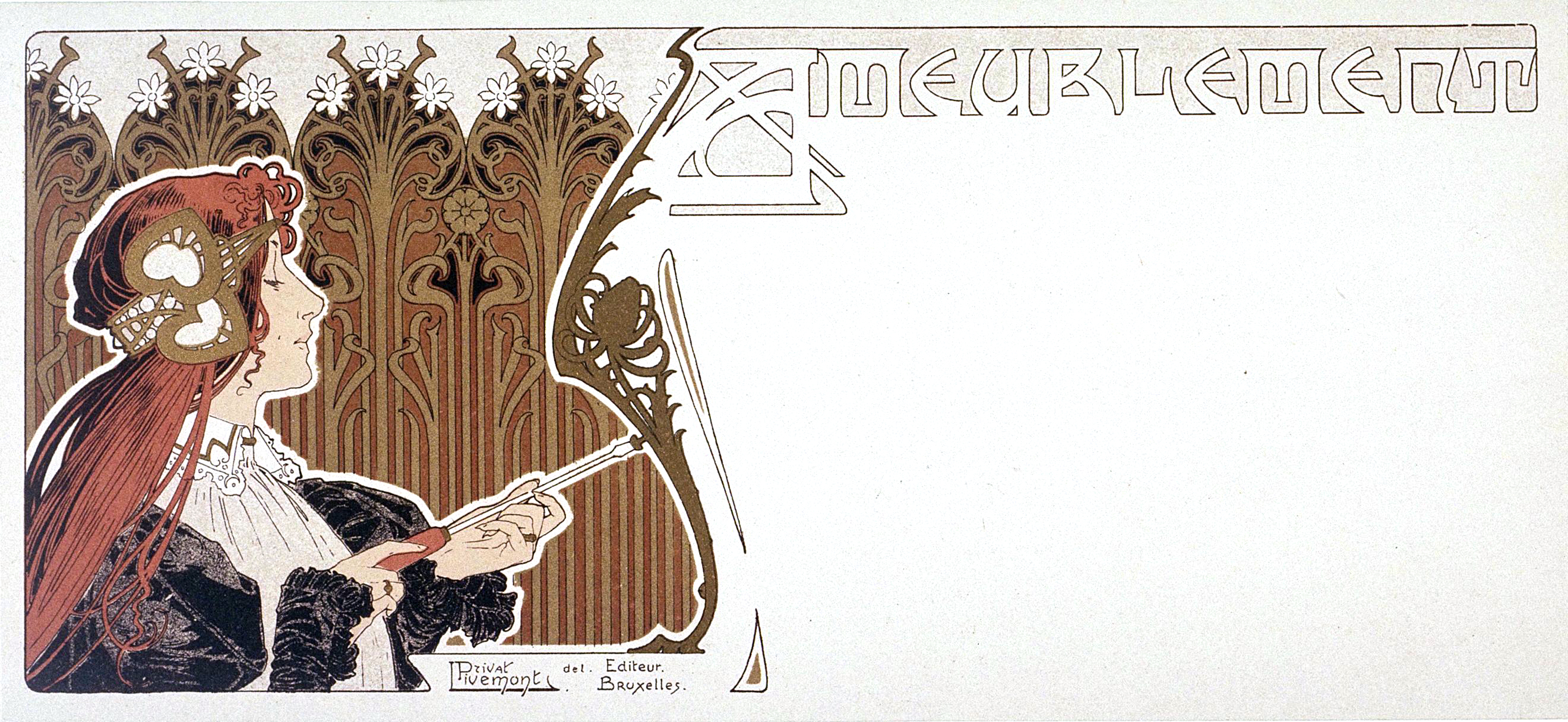
Ameublement (Furnishings), 1890

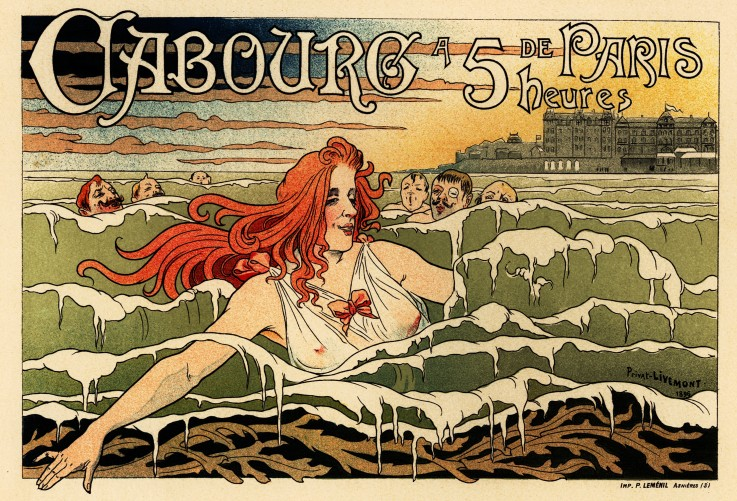
Casino de Cabourg, 1897

== Exhibitions ==
From March 2023 to January 2024, an exhibition of Livemont's posters was held at the Autrique House in Brussels.
