= Henri-Gabriel Ibels =

French painter (1867–1936)

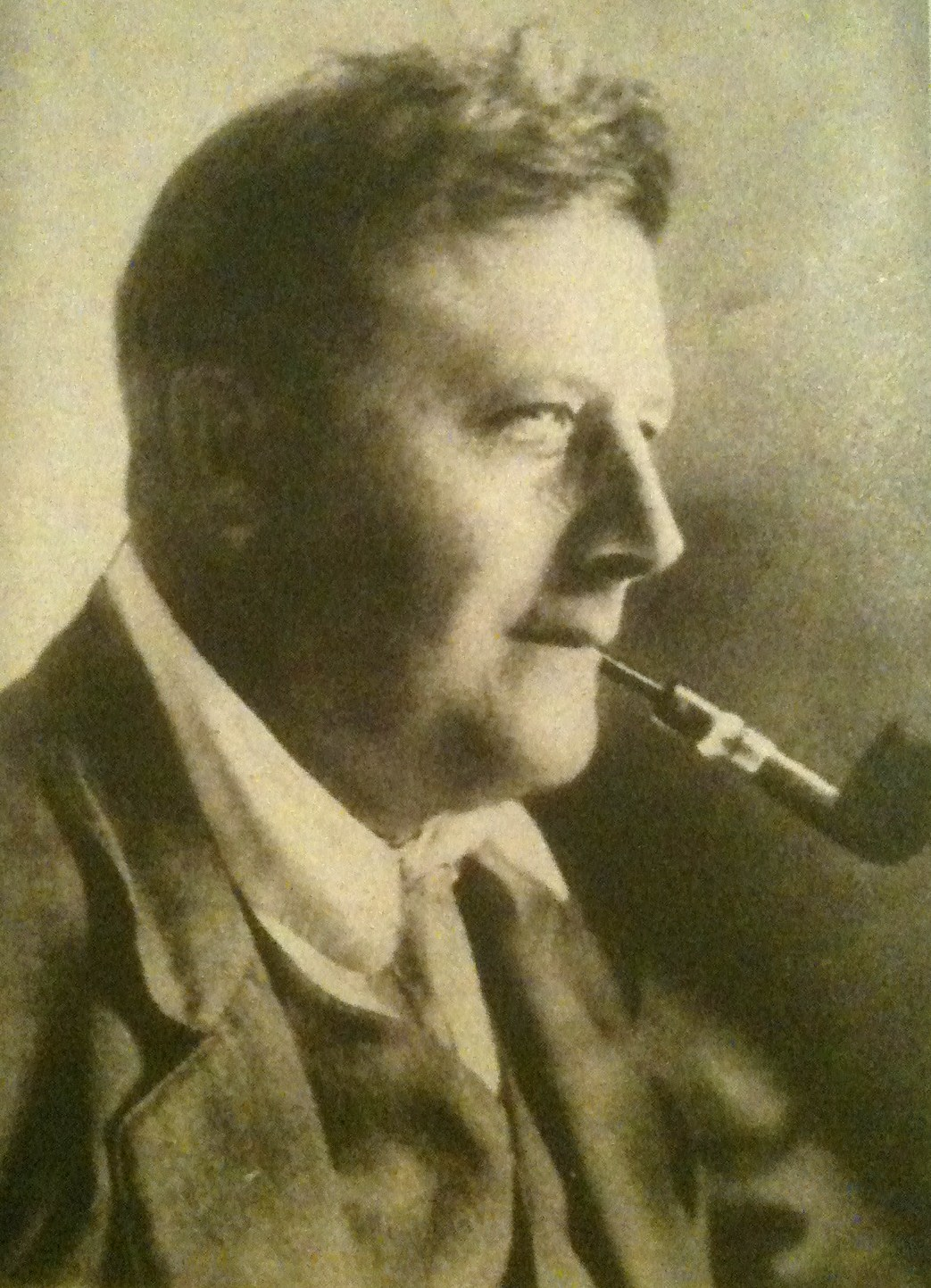
- Photo published in Je Sais Tout in March, 1914
- Born: 30 November 1867; Paris, France
- Died: 31 January 1936 (aged 68); Paris, France
- Education: Academie Julien
- Known for: painting; illustration; printing
- Movement: Abstract art, symbolism, early modernism

Henri-Gabriel Ibels (30 November 1867 – 31 January 1936) was a French illustrator, printmaker, painter and author.

== Biography ==
He was born in Paris and studied at the Académie Julian along with artists such as Pierre Bonnard and Édouard Vuillard. At the beginning of the term at the Académie Julian, Paul Sérusier gathered his friends around, including Ibels, and gave them the name Nabis. This is a Hebrew word for “prophet” and Ibels was a member since its 1889 founding. Though he was a part of the Societe de Independants "from a young age," he made his debut during the Nabi movement when he became one of the original members of Les Nabis. Other members included Bonnard, Vuillard, Félix Vallotton, Maurice Denis, Paul Sérusier, and Émile Bernard. Their early works consisted of bright colors and vibrant contour lines. Some of their goals were to reintroduce painting as a decorative art and make it part of everyday life. As his inspiration here, he used labor workers that he ran into at local bistros.

Along with painting, Ibels mastered the techniques and aesthetics of printmaking and a style suited for lithography for book illustration commissions, sheet-music covers, and advertisements. His participation in the Belle Epoque color revolution in lithography, for example, assisted in the development of Jules Cheret's use of the multi-chromatic processes, an art practice that overlapped colors in an attempt to create more depth and shade in print. He is described as a "consummate practitioner" by Andre Mellario in La Lithographie originale en couleurs for allowing the use of color and line drawing more accessible in print. His career was marked in 1891 when he took part in Les Nabis’ exhibitions at Le Barc de Boutteville gallery, "Impressionist and Symbolist Painters." With Vuillard and Denis he soon caught the public eye and earned the nickname ‘le Nabis journaliste’. Ibels earned this nickname as he frequently made regular publications to numerous newspapers and magazines. His main focus was drawing and lithography. He was passionate, loved the form of theater and entertainment, and attacked bourgeois values. Ibels is known for his skillfully crafted and precise lines. Ibels' first exhibit also took place in 1891 at the Salon des Independants. And in 1892, he created eight color lithographs for the 1892-93 season of the Theatre Libre in Montmartre. Inspired by contemporary life, Ibels' work consisted of subjects drawn from modern Paris such as the cafe, boxing rings, and the circus. The characteristics in subject and technique of simplistic colors and shapes within his work can also be likened to artists such as Henri de Toulouse-Lautrec, Adolphe Willette, and Theophile Alexandre Steinlen.

He contributed to several publications on anarchism. As photomechanical processes allowed lithographs and drawing to be cheaply reproduced in the press, editors and publishers began to incorporate caricatures within their journals during the 1890s. Illustrators such as Henri-Gabriel Ibels, Adolphe Willette, and Jean-Louis Forain began to contribute to all types of journals. Though their "anti-bourgeois attitudes" were not always anarchist, they contributed to anarchist leaning journals such as La Plume and La Courrier Francais to mock the revolution itself.

Ibels collaborated with Toulouse-Lautrec, with whom he developed a personal relationship and professional camaraderie. Henri-Gabriel painted various fans and one was similar to the style of Toulouse-Lautrec who used the theme of clowns in his paintings and lithographs. This resulted in a friendship as they would go to the circus together frequently for hours. This is where he would get his starting points for his drawings and pictures. He developed a style in his profiles of clowns, circus houses, and acrobats. In 1893, they also produced lithographs together for an album titled The Café-Concert. Toulouse-Lautrec would then become the godfather to Ibels' son and the two artists would remain friends until his death in 1901.

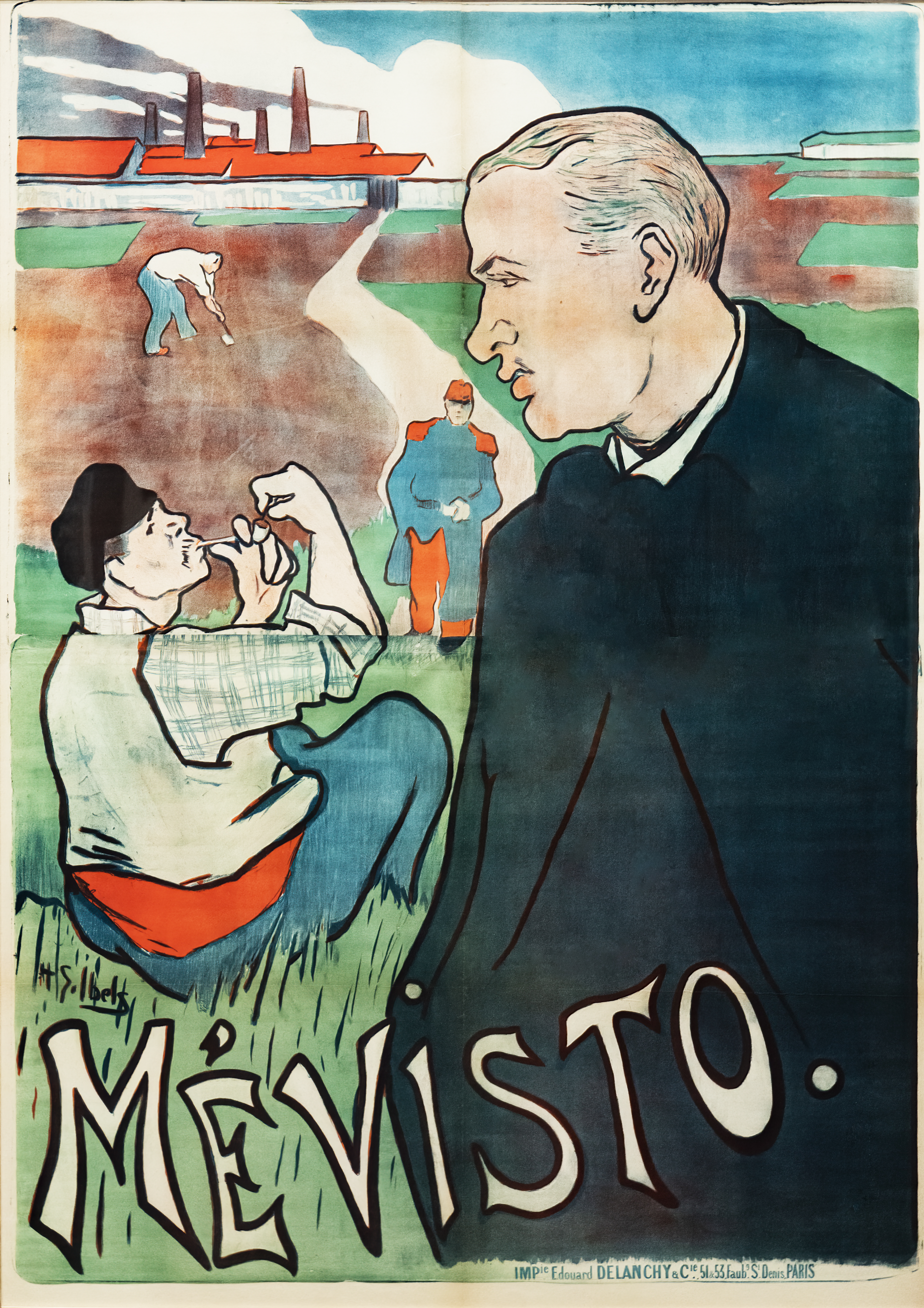
Poster for Mévisto 1892

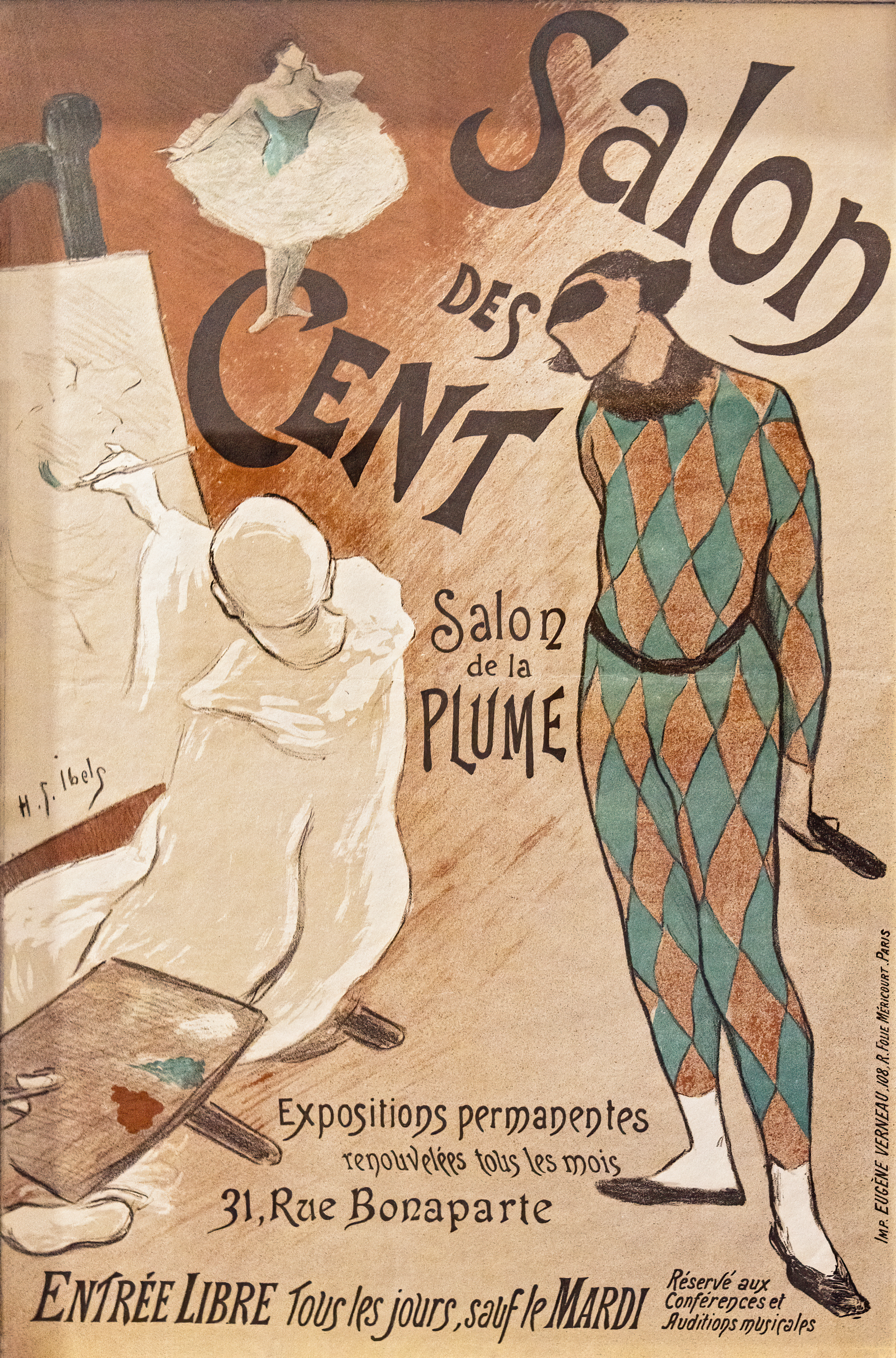
Poster for first Salon des Cent exhibition 1893

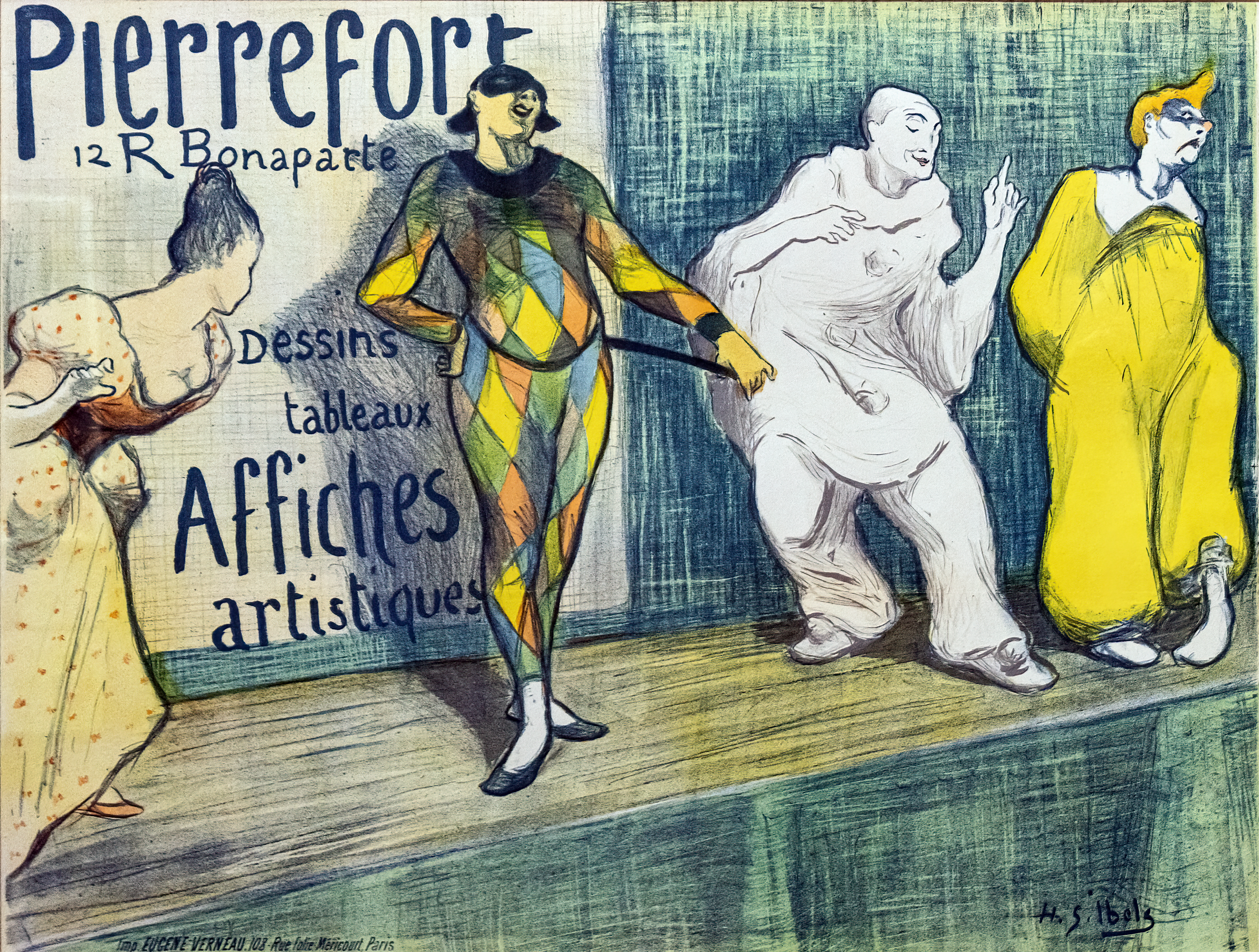
Poster for Galerie Pierrefort 1897

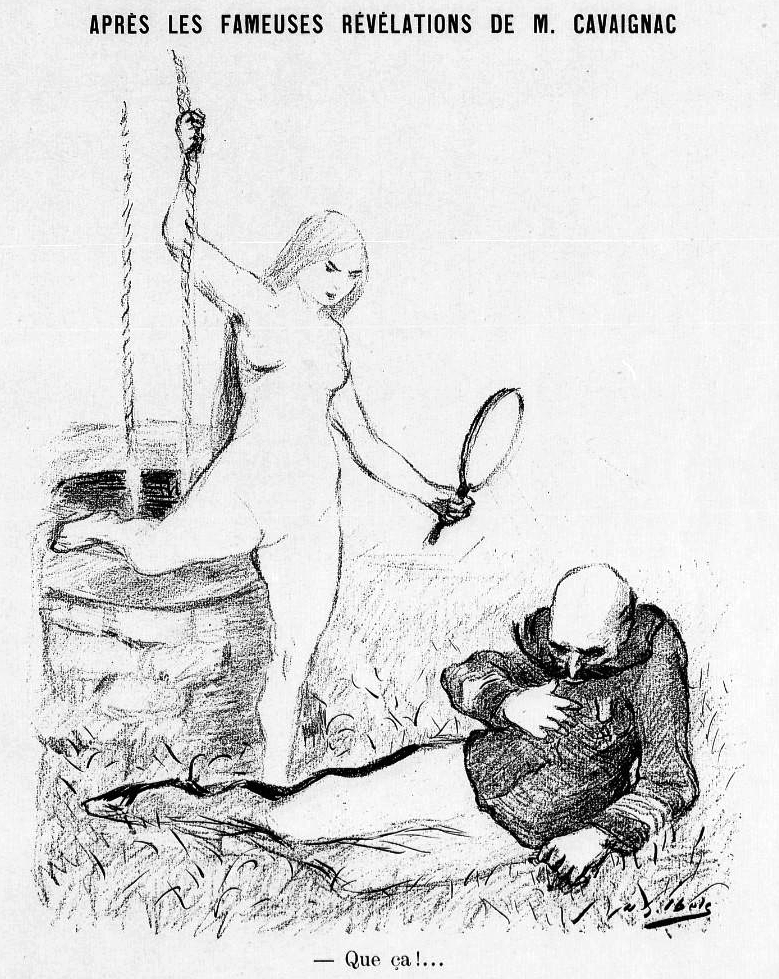
"Après les fameuses révélations de M. Cavaignac" : Commander Esterhazy, collapsed to the ground. Drawing in Le Sifflet, July 14, 1898.

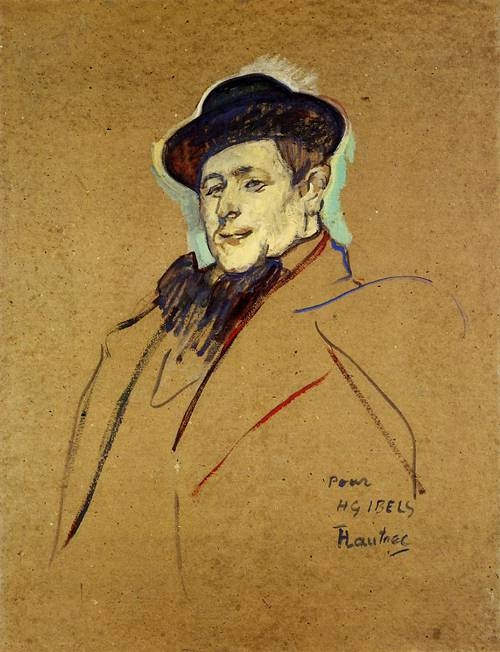
Portrait of Henri-Gabriel Ibels by Henri de Toulouse-Lautrec

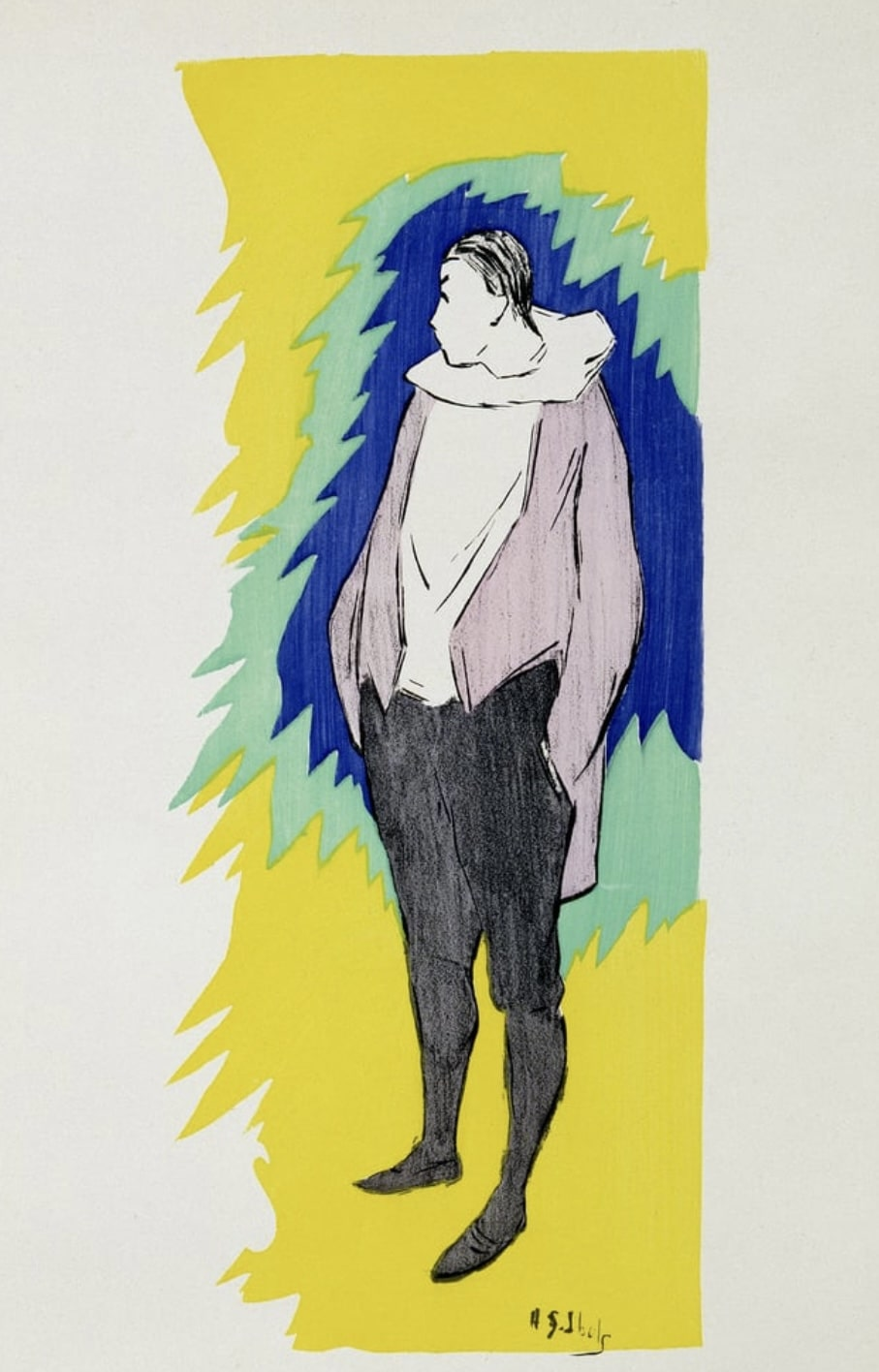
"Pierrot," collaboration with Toulouse-Lautrec depicting Pierrot figure. 1985

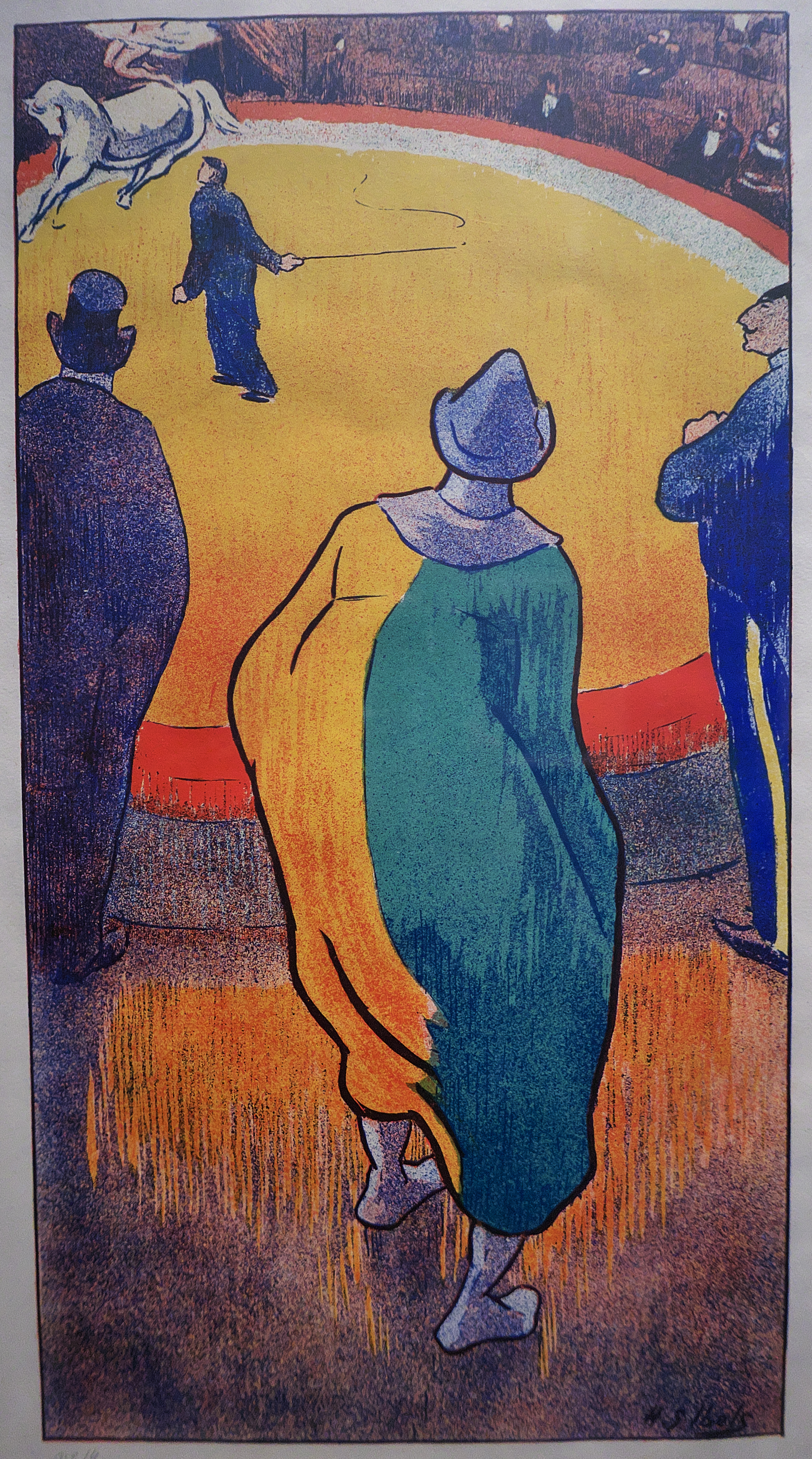
"Circus (Au Cirque) (Circus Ring)," lithographic print for L'Estampe originale, Album I. January–March, 1893
Faksimile-Poster published in Les Maîtres de l'Affiche

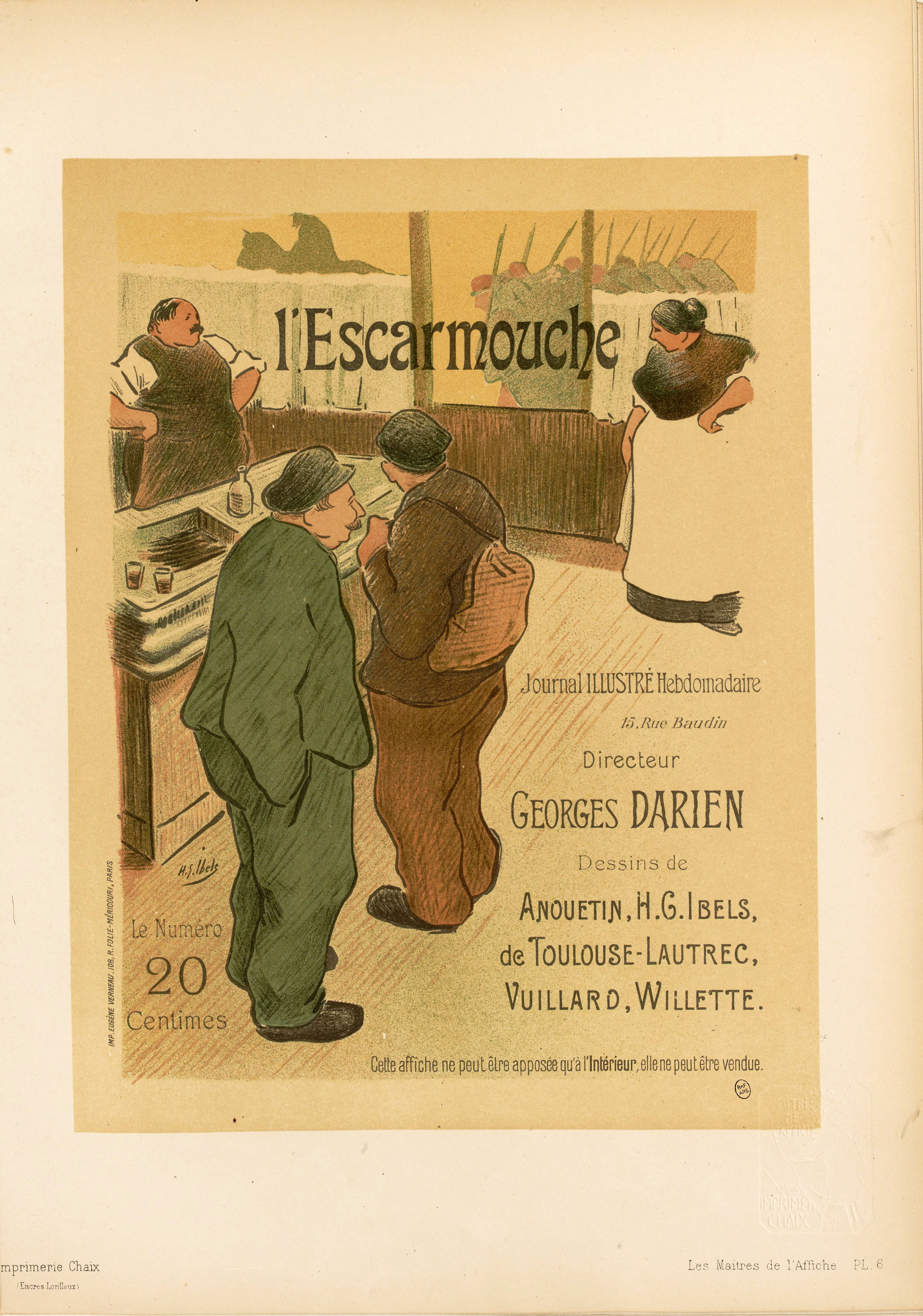
Poster 6

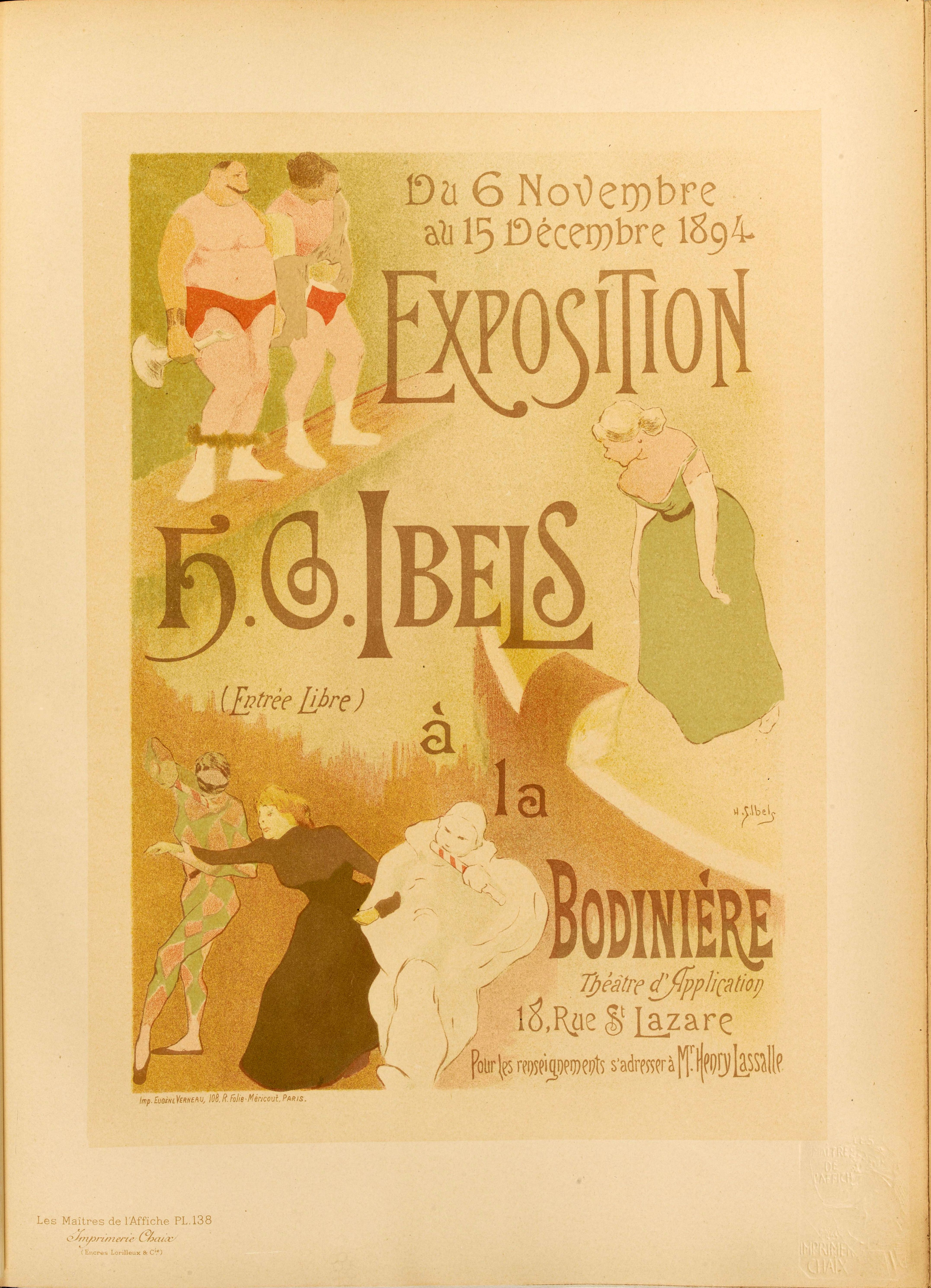
Poster 138

== The Nabis ==
The Nabis were most interested in Japanese art and they worked on decorative projects together. The Nabis studied Japanese prints to find new ideas and possibilities for color. They were against Impressionist art altogether and wanted art forms that were more expressive. They created screens in the 1890s that were the most original during that period along with artists such as George de Feure, Jacques Grüber, and Émile Gallé. In April 1895, there were 13 glass stained windows that were created from sketches and displayed at the Salon de la Societe Nationale des Beaux-Arts. Months later in December, 7 of these same stained glass-windows were presented at the Salon de L'Art Nouveau, Ibels' work included. The critical response varied as some found the designs here strange and the style too basic. Revue Franco-Americaine was one individual who actually applauded the idea of using young and talented artists full of new ideas. The Nabis often worked with avant-garde producers who helped restore theater during the last twenty years of the 19th century. They created these friendships at the Lycée Condorcet which grew their interest in theater. Some of these producers included André Antoine, Paul Fort, and Lugné-Poe. Out of all the members of the Nabis, Antoine ordered works from Ibels frequently. In 1896, he became Antoine's stage designer at the Théâtre de l'Odéon as their styles were more similar. His designs did not always receive praise from the public; a journalist named Courrier Francais expressed his displeasure of the art. He insinuated that Antoine was only trying to promote Ibels instead of good work. They disbanded in 1899, after 10 years, to develop as individuals and to be able to express themselves fully.

== Similarities among other artists ==
Henri-Gabriel Ibels had created a work titled “The Circus” which was initially thought to be by Georges Seurat. This misattribution was later identified through finding similarities between finding figures in the drawing and Ibels' lithographs, as well through his association with Cirque Fernando in Paris, where the drawing was likely made. Although both Ibels and Seurat shared an emphasis on drawing and a fascination with the circus as a subject matter, the work of Henri-Gabriel Ibels and Georges Seurat shares some distinct differences. Except Seurat is best known for his pointillist technique, in which he used tiny dots of color to create a sense of light and form in his paintings. His work often focused on capturing the effects of light and color through flat silhouettes, which can be seen is his work such as the Cafe Concert. On the other hand, Ibels's lithographs often showcased a more narrative-driven approach, with bold lines and rich textures. Regardless of differences, the incorporation of Ibels' lithographs into other artist's drawings suggest that Ibel's work was influential.

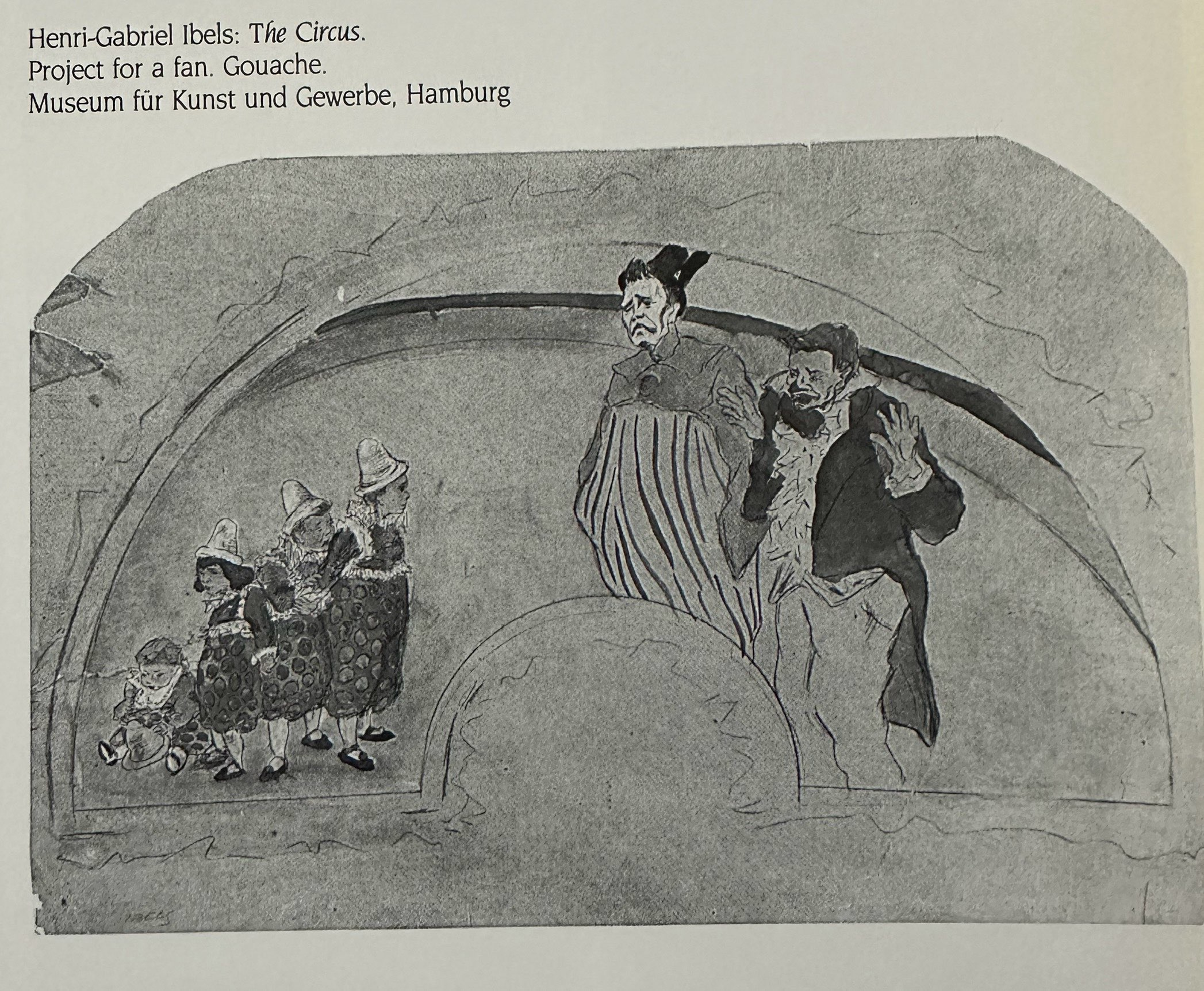
"The Circus," gouache print by Henri-Gabriel Ibels

During the time of the Dreyfus Affair, Ibels shared similarities in art work with Émile Zola, a journalist. Although Zola was a writer and Ibels was an artist, both became involved in the Dreyfus debate and vocalized their thoughts. Both would introduce in their work shared ideas about violence and lies. In addition, Ibels' text “Est-ce une Croix ou un Sabre?...”, presented in his artwork, and Zola's “Lettre à la France” both shared their shared ideas about a “sickness” France was suffering in their citizen's support of anti-Dreyfusard. Ibels expressed this ideology of a sickness by utilizing imagery of exhausted and tired soldiers in his drawings to demonstrate uniformed, conformity amongst citizens in support of anti-Dreysford. As Zola has famously said, "Discipline means obedience," Zola expressed an overarching view of soldiers unwilling to rule against a commander in chief for fear of punishment, an ideology that is also reflected in Ibels' work.In addition, they both had a share of language. Ibels' “Le Coup de Père François” and Zola's use of words such as “tyranny”, “boot”, “sword”, and “dictator” created a sense of menace.

== Ibels in the Dreyfus Affair ==
As a prominent French artist who spoke through his art, Henri-Gabriel Ibels played a significant role in shaping the narrative around the Dreyfus Affair during the late 19th century. The Dreyfus affair was a political scandal in which antisemitism was practiced. There was a difficult struggle of the early Dreyfusards (Those who supported Alfred Dreyfus, a Jewish captain in the French Army) to prove the innocence of Alfred Dreyfus in his conviction of selling military secrets to the German government. As a result, this caused a series of anti-Jewish controversies that Ibels addressed in his artwork, knows as “Dreyfusard art”. Before the Dreyfus affair, Ibels was like a vigilante artist supporting the cause but would soon publicly come out and change his stance in the Jewish newspaper, La Libre Parole. In specific, Ibels' artwork of caricatures was created in an effort to present how the Dreyfus Affair was more of a French rather than Jewish issue. It was through his artwork that he would campaign to counteract ideas of national identity in France, that attempted to exclude Jews, in an effort to go against the ideas of anti-Dreyfusism and become an activist for social change.

Ibels would come across other artists, such as one named Zola, and collaborate due to their common fight for Dreyfus and rivalries with anti-Dreyfusard artists. Artwork such as LaTerre would present his, and Zola's, involvement in political-activism during this time. In addition, because he had experienced a position in both sides, his iconography during the Dreyfus Affair would become recognized as an encyclopedia of blogger-like pro- or anti-Dreyfus imagery. For example, Ibels' visuals, such as the cover of his 1898 “Allons-y! Histoire Contemporaine,” was published in an effort to mock and question military's interference in civilian court, and indicate the Jewish had no association in the movement that grew around Dreyfus. As a result, Ibels became recognized as the driving force behind the popularization of "Allons-y!" as a catchphrase associated with artwork aimed at exposing and criticizing anti-Dreyfusard propaganda.

Although a driving force in politics, Ibels expressed underlying regret in becoming distant from Les Nabis as a result of his political and social commitments. Anne Marie Sauvage recalls Ibels reflecting on Homage to Cézanne in which the leading members of the Les Nabis group members are presented in a painting made by Maurice Denis. Despite Ibels being a leading member of Les Nabis, it excludes Ibels. Sauvage recalls Ibels stating, “Why am I not among them? It's my fault, my great fault! Because of their wise and calm environment, I preferred the turbulence of political struggles.”
