= Salon des Cent =

Commercial art exhibition in Paris, France (1894–1900)

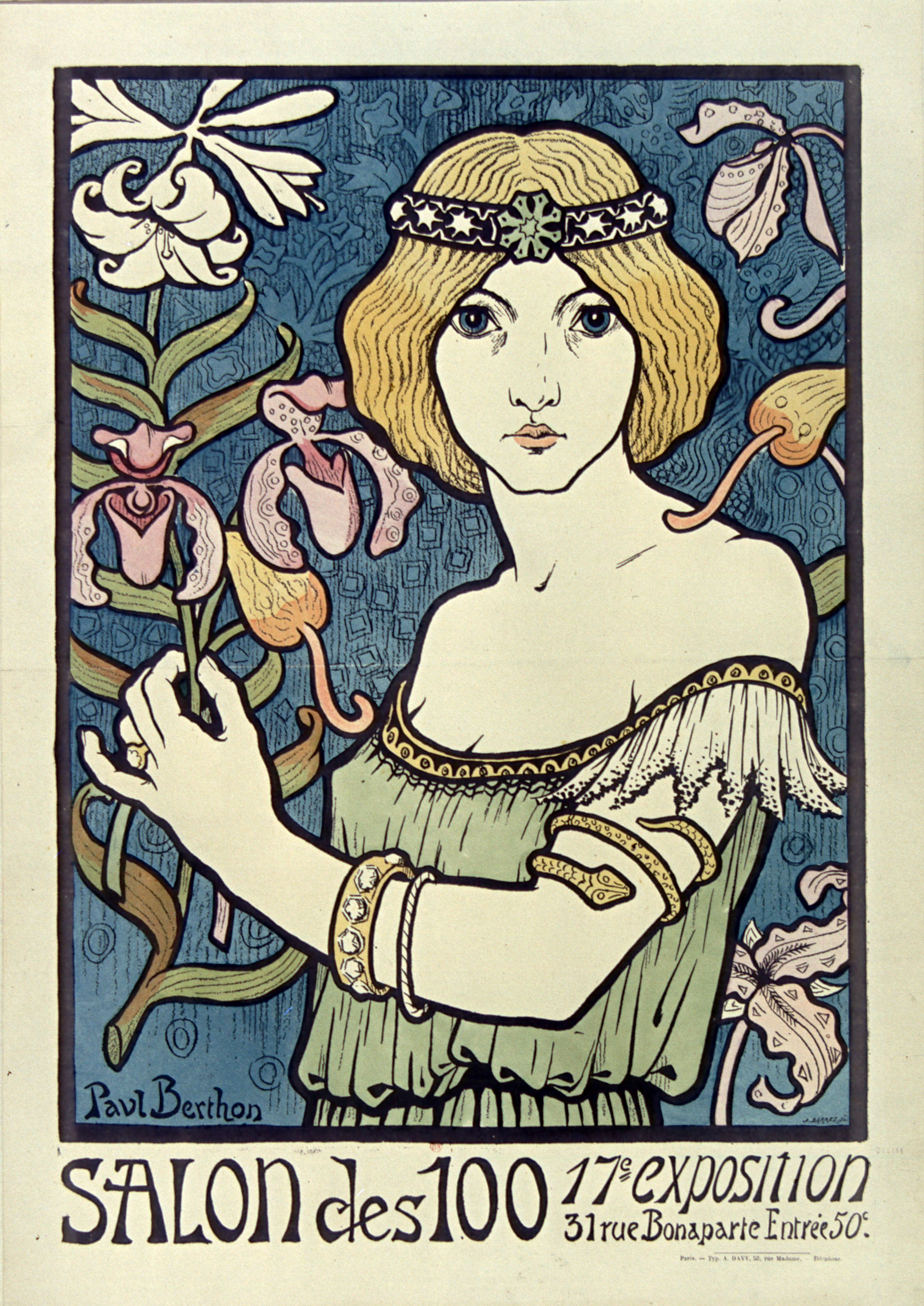
Poster for the 17th Exhibition, by Paul Berthon

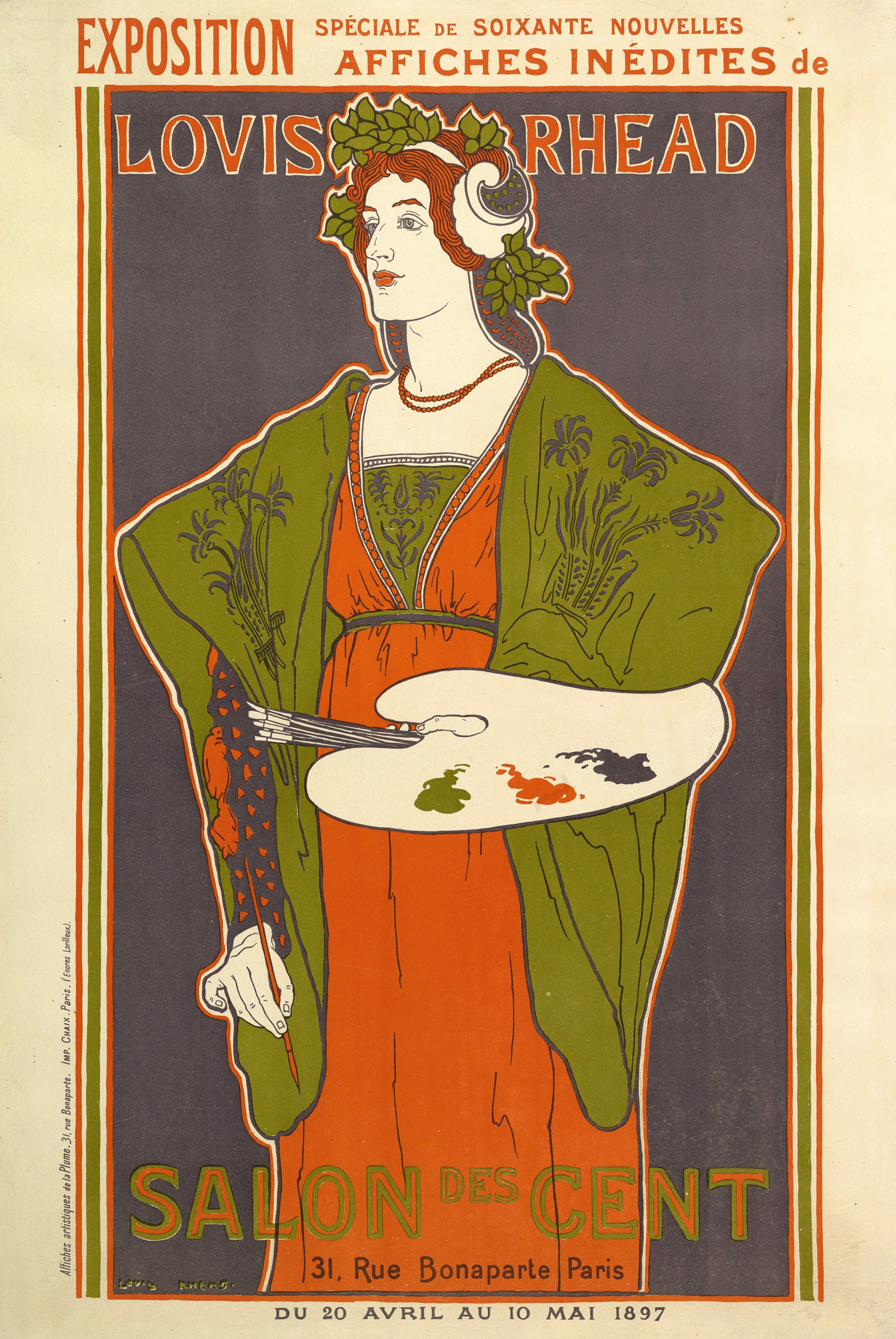
May 1897 exposition poster by Louis Rhead

Salon des Cent ("Salon of the One Hundred") was a commercial art exhibition in Paris, based at 31 Rue Bonaparte. The Salon sold color posters, prints and reproductions of artwork to the general public at reasonable prices. It was established in February 1894 by Léon Deschamps, founder of La Plume ("The Pen") an avant garde literary and artistic magazine. It became known for its exhibitions showcasing the works of contemporary graphical artists. The salon held exhibitions until 1900. Many of the posters advertising Salon des Cent exhibitions have themselves become collector's items.

== La Plume ==
La Plume was an artistic and literary journal founded by Léon Deschamps in 1889, at first located on 36 Boulevard Arago. Articles in La Plume covered a broad range of subjects ranging from realism, socialism and anarchism to Catholic mysticism and the aristocracy. The journal moved to 31 Rue Bonaparte in July 1891, where the spacious new offices gave room to mount art exhibitions. Before these began, La Plume displayed various objects in the "Salon de la Plume", with the visual arts taking second place to objects associated with literature, poetry and philosophy.

Advances in color lithography in the 1890s made it practical to make large posters for use as advertisements, and also for art collectors. A poster craze developed, with huge demand for Art Nouveau lithographs in Europe and America. The growing focus of La Plume on contemporary graphical art was clearly established by the publication of an issue of La Plume in November 1893 dedicated to the history of the poster. At times the magazine would devote a special issue to one artist. These included Pierre Puvis de Chavannes, James Ensor, Alexandre Falguière, André des Gachons, Eugène Grasset, Henry de Groux, Alphonse Mucha and Auguste Rodin.

== Salon ==
In theory Le Salon des Cent was a group of one hundred artists, hence the name, but there was never a precise list and participation varied. Some artists were invited to become members, including Puvis de Chavannes, Jules Chéret, Grasset and Marcellin Desboutin. Others were simply artists who had been asked to participate in exhibitions. The salon had no jury and no prizes, and the artists could choose what they wanted to exhibit, being constrained only by the available space. The Salon des Cent publicized itself as a permanent, constantly changing exhibition of its members' works. It exerted considerable influence on development of the Art Nouveau poster.

Le Salon des Cent usually exhibited in a set of rooms within the magazine premises. An exhibition of the Salon des Cent was announced in October 1891, and again in February 1892, but in fact the first exhibition at 31 Rue Bonaparte was not until 1 February 1894. In addition to the sales catalogs for the works of various artists, the many special editions of La Plume served as catalogs for specific exhibitions. The Salon also commissioned special posters for its exhibitions. The Salon built up a huge collection of original posters from many countries, and acted as both wholesaler and retailer of these works. The collection included all of Mucha's posters and paintings, and many by Henri de Toulouse-Lautrec, Berthon, de Feure and the Glasgow Four as well as American artists.

== Artists ==
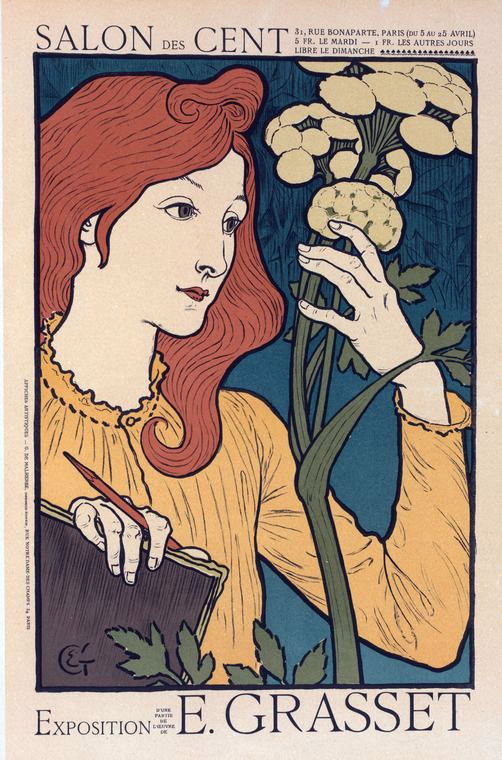
Poster for the second Salon in April 1894 by Eugène Grasset

Eugène Grasset was active in the Salon des Cent. He first tackled the Art Nouveau poster style in his posters for the 1894 Salon des Cents. The second exhibition, which opened on 3 April 1894, was entirely devoted to his works. A special edition of La Plume of 15 May 1894 was dedicated to Grasset. The poster by Georges de Feure for the fifth Salon des Cent announced the themes that would dominate painting in the following years, and has been widely reproduced. In many ways it copies the poster for the second Salon. It reflects de Feutre's interest in medieval times. The poster, filling the frame with a bold composition, shows a simply-dressed young woman gazing thoughtfully at an umbel of angelica.

In January 1895 Mucha's Art Nouveau poster for Sarah Bernhardt as Gismonda was displayed across Paris. The next year Mucha created the poster for the 20th Salon exhibition, which opened on 22 April 1896. When Léon Deschamps saw the draft he told Mucha, "Execute this design just as it is, and you will have created the masterpiece of the illustrated decorative poster." In June 1897 the Salon put on an exhibition dedicated to Mucha. Some of the posters by Mucha and Grasset were printed in very limited editions on silk satin.

Georges de Feure exhibited for the first time at the fourth Salon des Cent, which took place at the Boulogne-sur-Mer Casino for the whole month of August 1894. The fifth exhibition, at 31 rue Bonaparte from 5–30 October 1894, exhibited almost the same works. Georges de Feure was to exhibit at the Salon for several years. Léon Deschamps and La Plume played a major role in the artistic development of his posters.

Toulouse-Lautrec exhibited several times at the Salon des Cent between 1895 and 1898. Lautrec's La Passagere du 54 – Promenade en Yacht was used as the poster for the 1896 opening of the International Poster Exhibition at the Salons des Cent. His series Elles was exhibited as a whole for the first time in 1896 at the 20th Salon exhibition. James Ensor exhibited some of his etchings at the Salon in 1898, using an 1888 drawing called Demons teasing me as a poster for the exhibit. La Plume published a special edition to accompany the show that included several articles praising his work. This was Ensor's first one-man exhibition outside Belgium.

Other posters included classic Art Nouveau images by Paul Berthon, Fernand Fau, Arsène Herbinier and Firmin Bouisset. Notable artists who showcased at the Salon des Cent also included Albert André, Pierre Bonnard, Frédéric-Auguste Cazals, Edgar Degas, Henri Evenepoel, Henri-Gabriel Ibels, Gustave-Henri Jossot, René Lalique, Henri Matisse, Gustave Moreau and Louis Valtat.

== Gallery ==
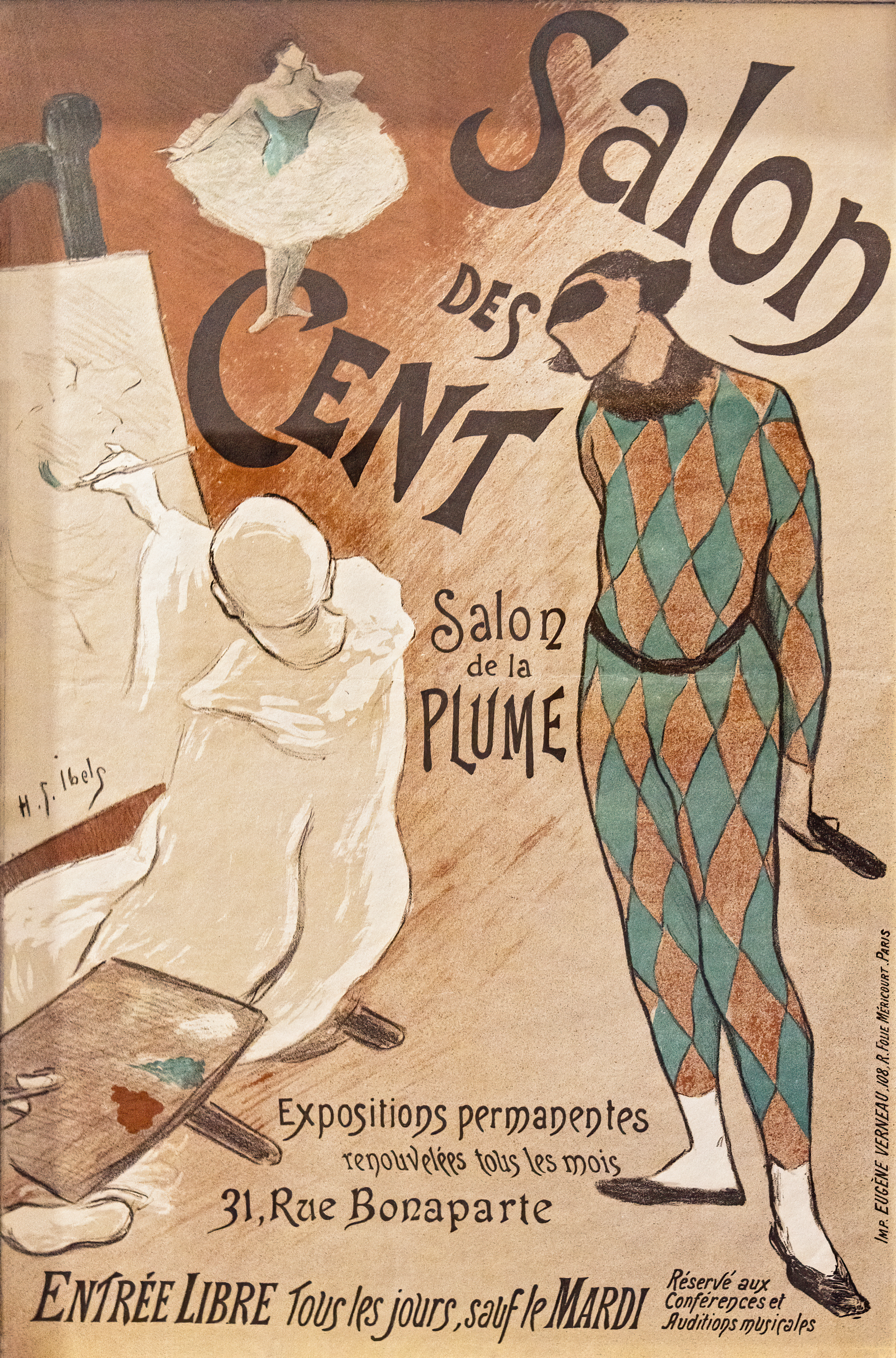
Henri-Gabriel Ibels poster for the first Salon des Cent exhibition 1893. The exhibition actually opened on 1 February 1894.

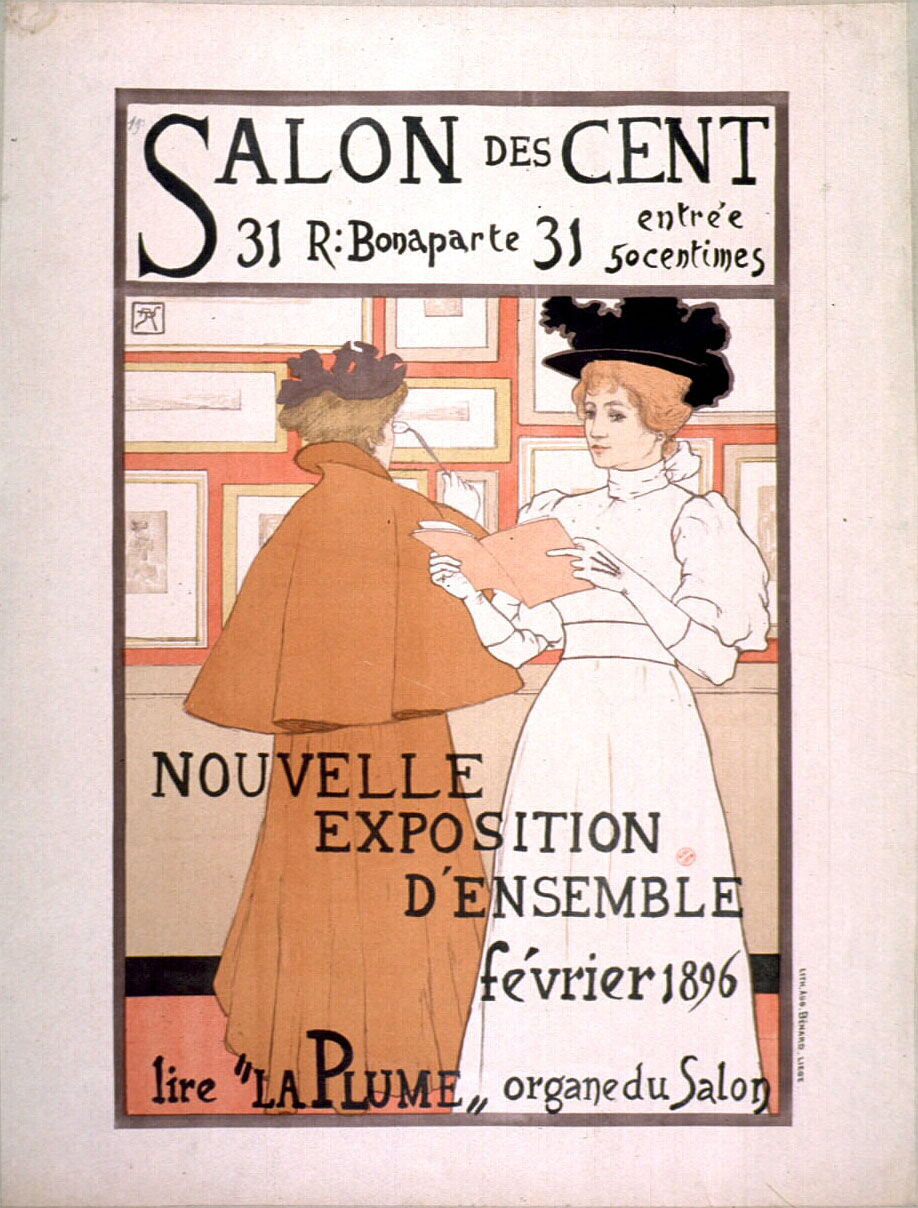
1895 poster by Armand Rassenfosse.

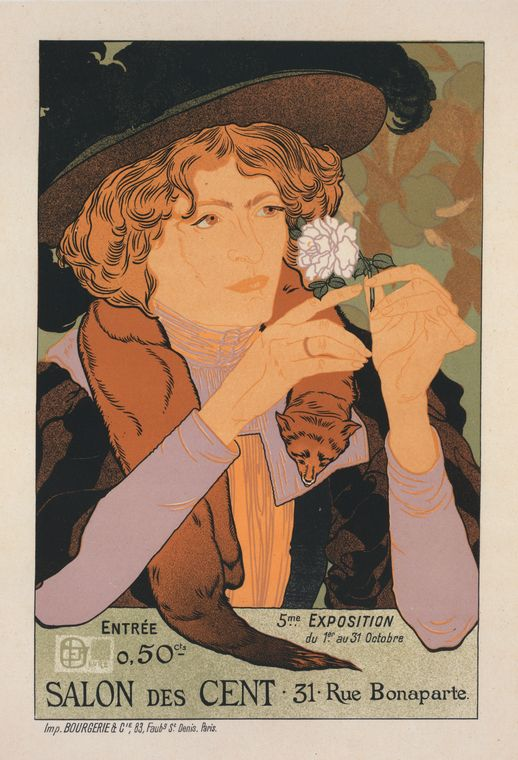
Poster by Georges de Feure, advertising the fifth Salon.

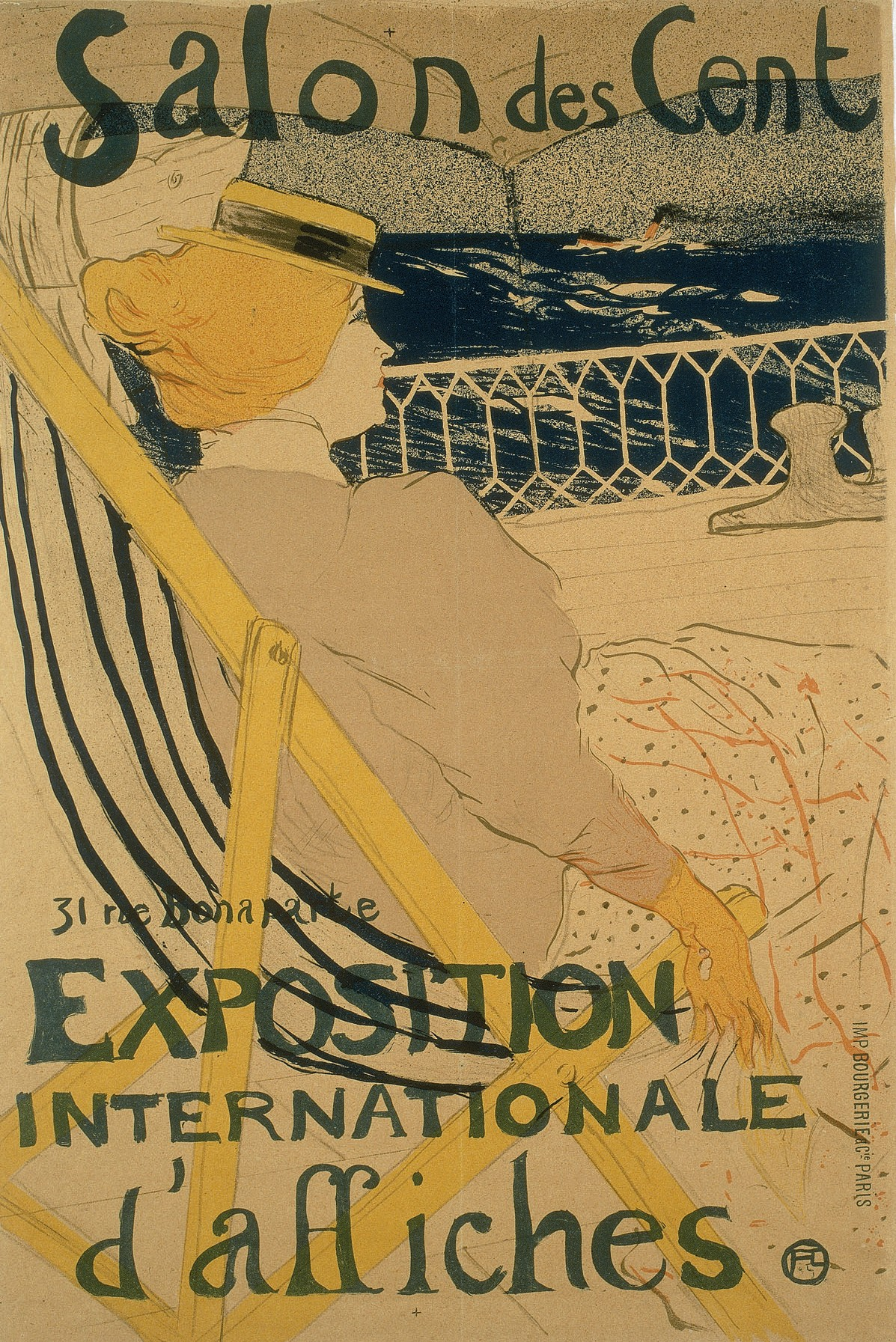
1895 poster by Henri de Toulouse-Lautrec, La Passagere du 54, used for the 1896 Salon exhibition of international posters.

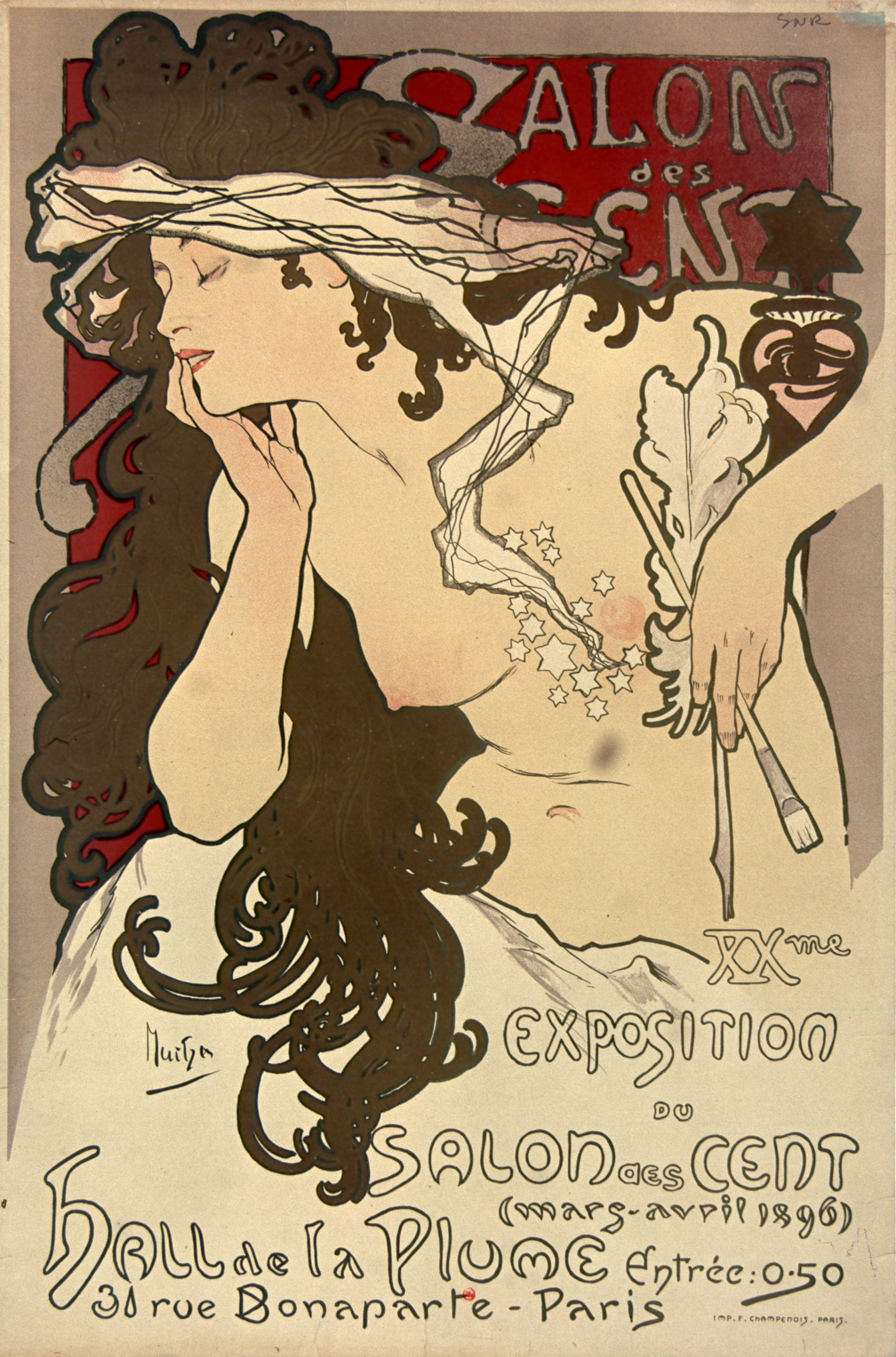
Post by Alphonse Mucha for the twentieth Salon des Cent, April 1896

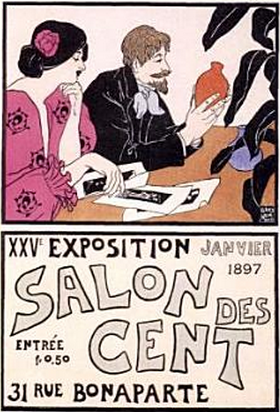
Poster by Andrew Kay Womrath for the 25th exhibition, March 1897

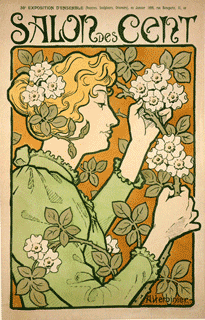
1897 poster by Arsène Herbinier

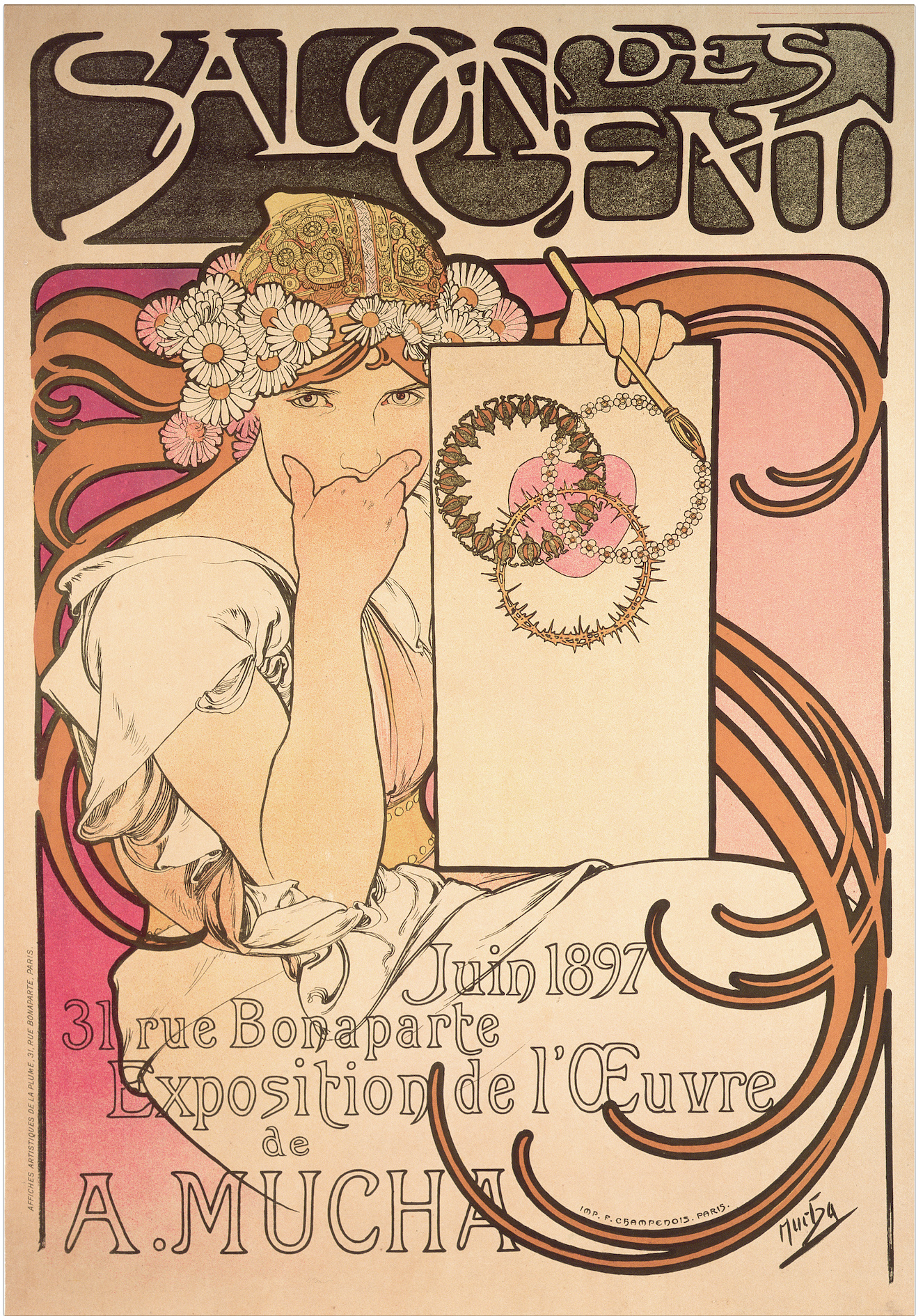
Mucha poster for the Salon des Cent exhibition of June 1897.

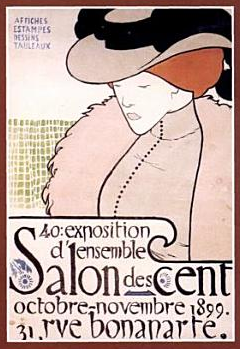
1899 poster for the 40th exhibition of the Salon des Cent by Henri Evenepoel.

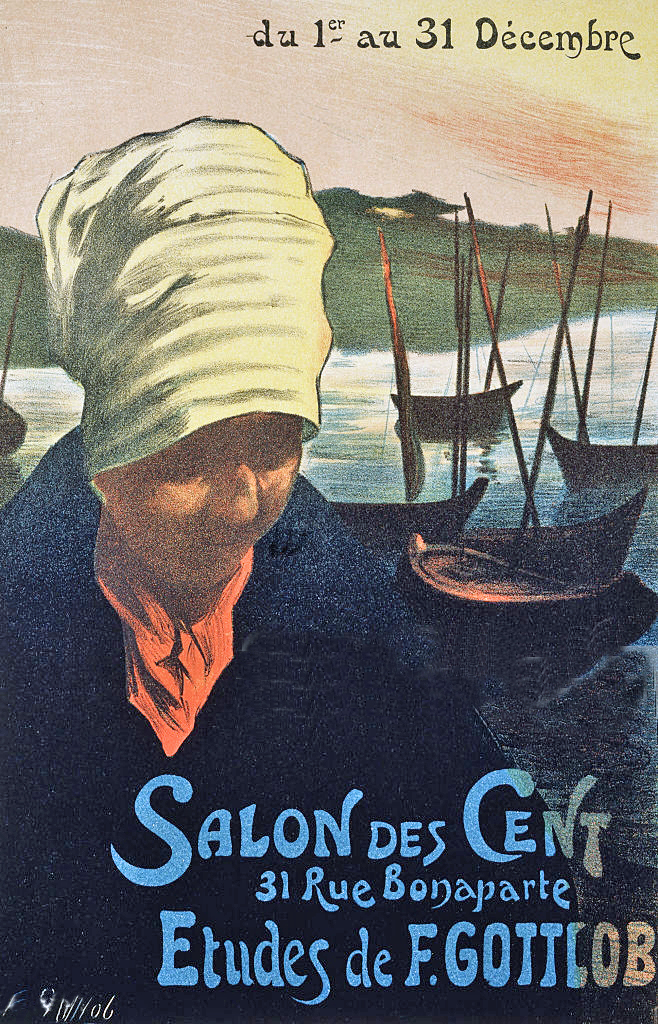
Poster for a Salon des Cent exhibition in December 1899 by Fernand Louis Gottlob
