= Ligue Souvenez-vous! =

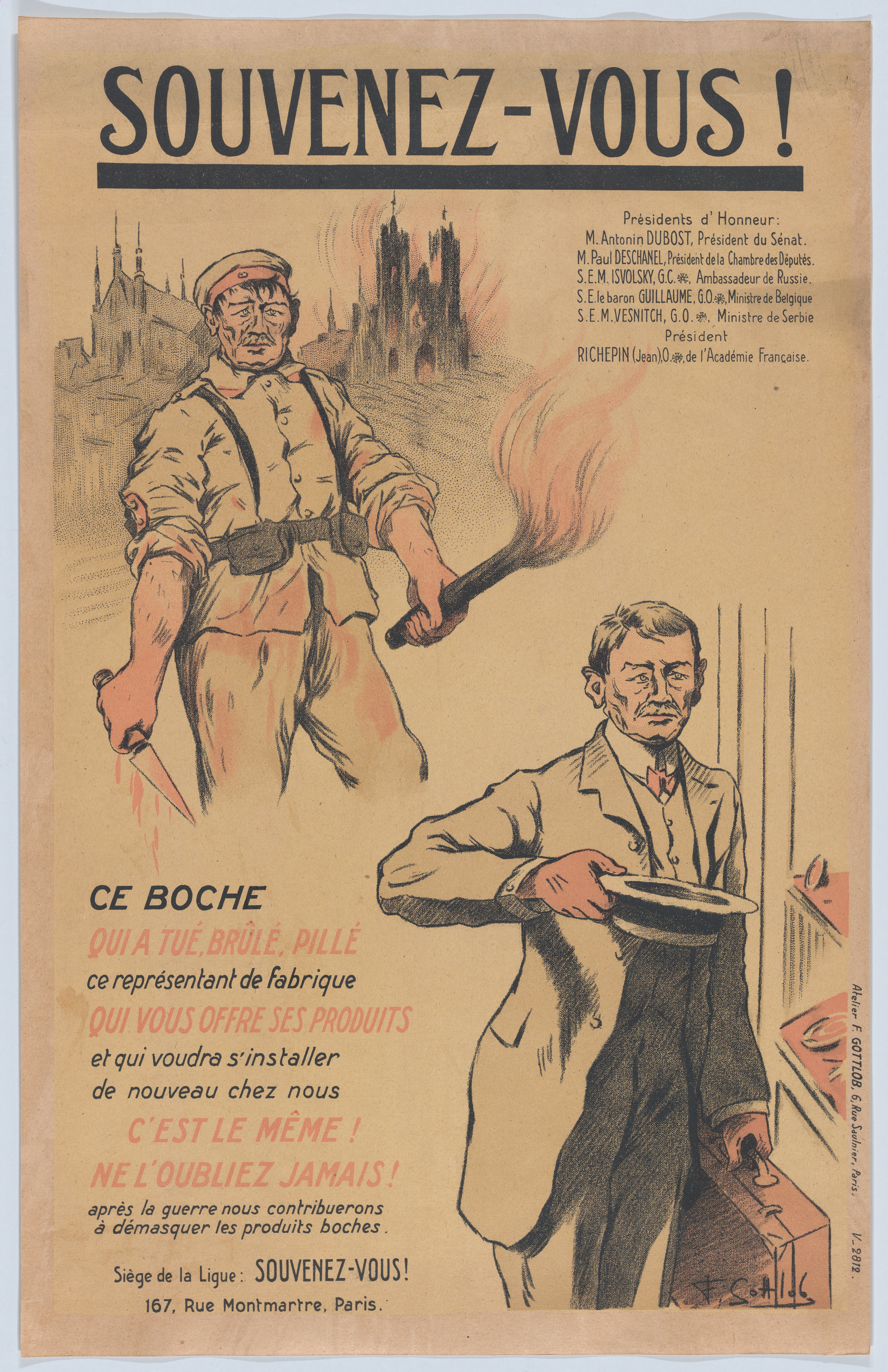
Poster designed by Fernand Louis Gottlob and produced in large numbers by the league. It was also turned into a stamp which was later added to their newsletter.

Ligue Souvenez-vous! (Remember! League) was a patriotic organisation established in France on 16 February 1916 in order to ensure that French public opinion remained aware of the atrocities committed by the German Army in the 1914 invasion of France. Jean Richepin, active as a franc-tireur during the Franco-Prussian War was their honorary president. Richepin was keen to sustain what he termed a "sacred hatred" for "German Barbarism" which he regarded as threatening the values of "justice, charity, law, liberty and light" which he regarded as characterising French civilisation. Antonin Dubost, Paul Deschanel, Alexander Izvolsky (Russian Ambassador), Baron Guillaume (Belgian Minister) and Milenko Radomar Vesnić (Serbian Minister in Paris) also supported the league.

The league produced a regular newsletter, various posters and held meetings. They had activists across much of unoccupied France by the end of 1916.
