= Fernand Louis Gottlob =

French graphic artist (1873–1935)

- Born: February 23, 1873; Paris, France
- Died: November 10, 1935 (aged 62); Paris, France
- Occupation: Artist
- Known for: Humorous pictures

Fernand-Louis Gottlob (February 23, 1873 – November 10, 1935) was a French graphic artist whose caricatures appeared in many humorous magazines.

== Life ==
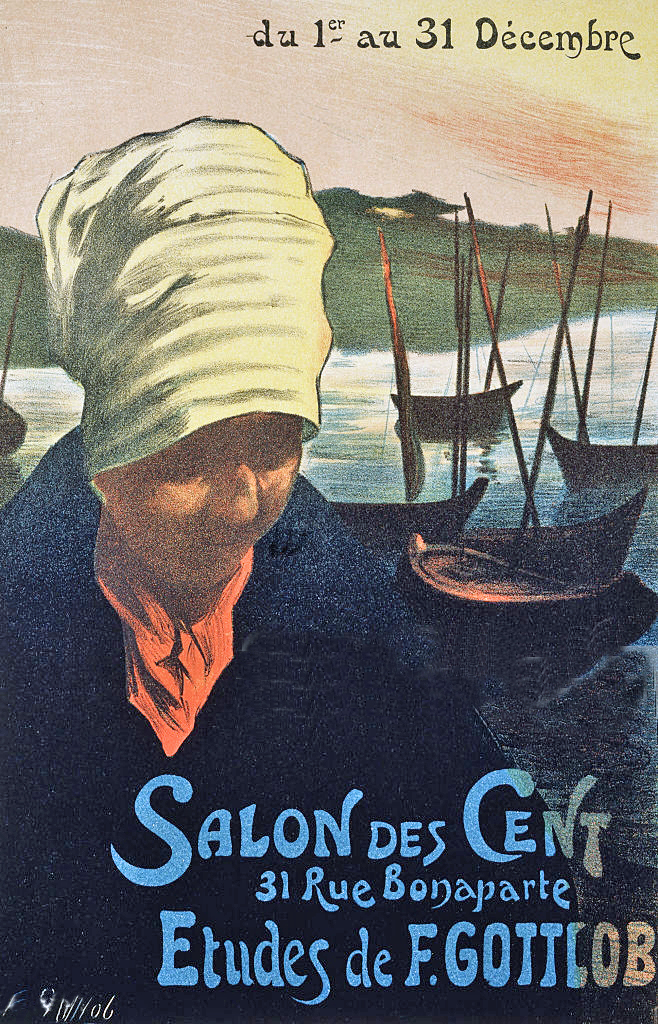
Poster for a Salon des Cent exhibition in December 1899

Fernand Louis Gottlob was born in Paris in 1873. He studied under the painter-decorator Armand Félix Marie Jobbé-Duval (1821–1889). He was also taught by Laporte and G. Fuchs. He became a painter, lithographer, caricaturist, commercial artist, illustrator and graphic designer for song scores. He created portraits, illustrations for books and caricatures that appeared in popular magazines in Paris including Le Rire, Le Journal Amusement and Le Sourire. His work began to be shown in the official salons in 1891.

Gottlob was among the artists who contributed to L'Estampe Moderne, a limited edition series of portfolios of high-quality lithographs that was published monthly from May 1897 and April 1899. His work first appeared in L'Assiette au Beurre in the second issue, on 11 April 1901. He became a member of the Cornet Society in 1904 and, between then and his death designed twelve menus for the society. He died in Paris in 1935.

== Works ==
Gottlob's 1900 poster for the 2nd Exposition of Painter-Lithographers on the Rue Drouot in Paris shows a strong influence of Henri de Toulouse-Lautrec in its composition. A woman is in front of a large illuminated window, and the dramatic back-lighting emphasizes the dark forms of her dress and hat. He created relatively few posters in his life, but this exposition of posters was one in which he participated. In addition to lithographs and portraits, he painted cityscapes of Paris and landscapes of Normandy and Brittany.

In one of Gottlob's poignant images for the Assiette au Beurre he shows a mother with her children during a snowstorm, in front of the window of a bakery. The mother is explaining, "Ça, mon enfant, c'est du pain" ("That is bread, my child"). In 1916 he designed a poster for the Ligue Souvenez-vous! which they produced in large numbers and also used as a stamp.

In the 1970s Irene and Howard Stein began collecting color posters by well-known artists of the early 20th century such as Mucha, Chéret and Gottlob. Their collection grew with the acquisition of work by Toulouse-Lautrec to become one of the largest such collections in the United States.

=== Posters ===
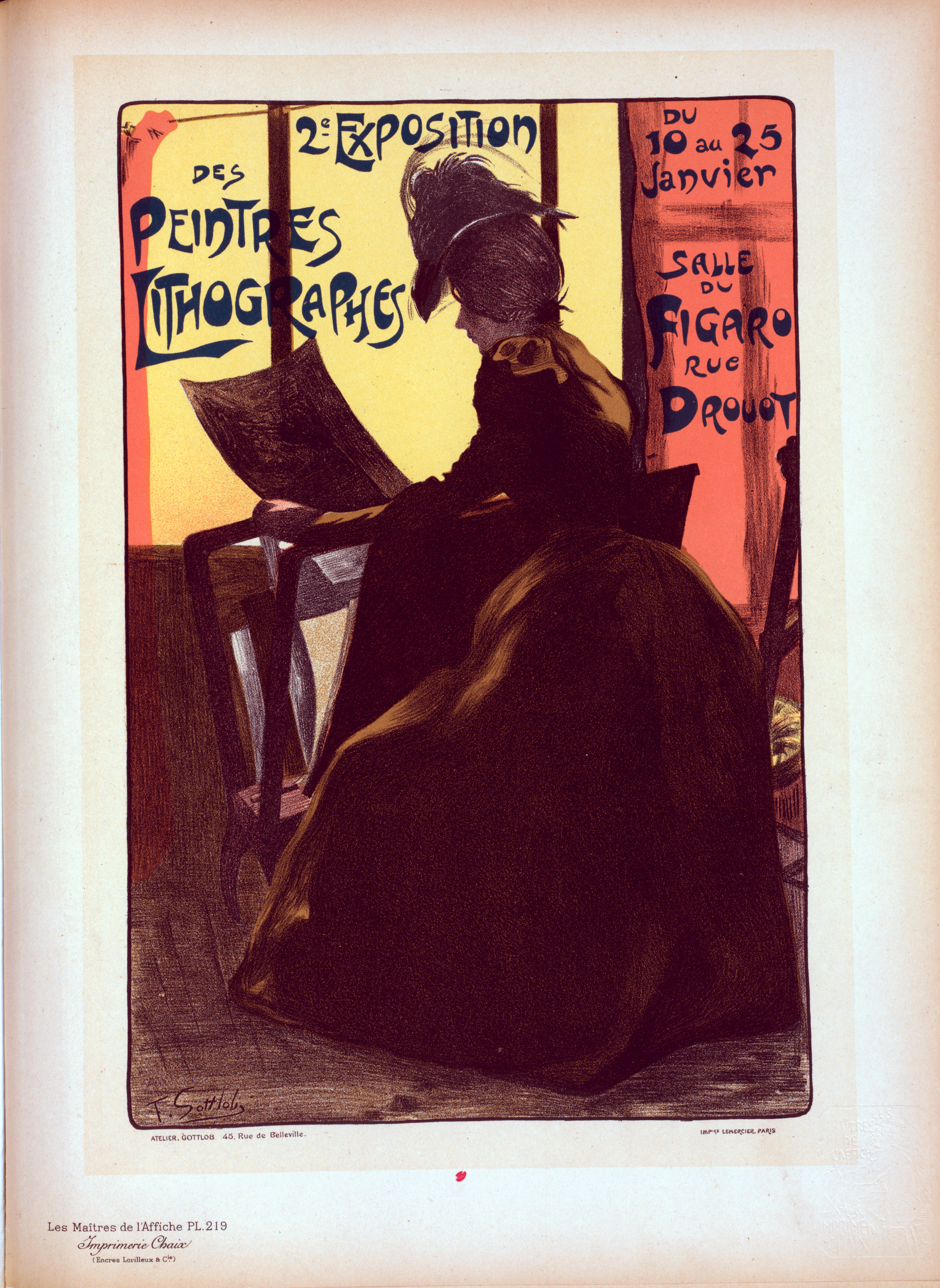
Poster 5 in Les Maîtres de l'Affiche

- 1899 : Exposition au Salon des Cent.
- 1900 : 2^{e} Exposition des Peintres-Lithographes (Imprimeries Lemercier) sur Gallica.
- 1905 : Théâtre National de l'Opéra-Comique. Les Pêcheurs de St. Jean [Scènes de la vie maritime] de Henri Caïn. Musique de Charles-Marie Widor.
- 1916 : La Matadora
- 1919 : Souvenez-vous ! sur Gallica.

=== Book illustrations ===
- Michel Corday, Intérieurs d'officiers, Simonis Empis, 1896.
- Louis Brunet, Fille de France, Paris, C. Delagrave, 1899.
- Alphonse Gallais, Amours d'Apaches, roman de la basse pègre, Paris, P. Fort, 1903.
- Georges Courteline, Boubouroche, Paris, Calmann-Lévy, [1907]
- Alfred Capus, L'Oiseau blessé, suivi de Les Passagères, coll. Modern-Théâtre », Paris, Fayard, s.d.
- Comte Leo Tolstoy, Anna Karénine : pages choisies, Paris, J. Ferenczi, s.d.
- Maxim Gorky, L'amour mortel [et autres textes], illustrations hors texte de Gottlob et Poulbot, Paris, J. Ferenczi s.d.

== Sources ==
- 2e Exposition des Peintres Lithographes, V&A: Victoria and Albert Museum
- "Affiche for the 2e Exposition des Peintres Lithographes", Newegg
- Appelbaum, Stanley (1978), "Fernand-Louis Gottlob", French Satirical Drawings from "L'Assiette Au Beurre": Selection, Translations, and Text, Courier Dover Publications, ISBN 0486235831
- Castleman, Riva (March 1998), Toulouse-Lautrec: posters and prints from the collection of Irene and Howard Stein, High Museum of Art, ISBN 9780939802845
- Fanelli, Giovanni M.; Godoli, Ezio (1987), "Fernand Louis GOTTLOB", Art Nouveau Postcards, Random House Incorporated, ISBN 978-0-8478-0832-8
- "Fernand-Louis Gottlob", Art in Print, archived from the original on 2008-12-03
- L'Estampe Moderne (in French), Christian Richet
- Smith, Jason; Nault, Raymond, "Fernand Gottlob", Parisian Art Discovery, The Cornet Group
- Wolfe, Diana Ewan (1 June 1981), Prints about prints, Martin Gordon, ISBN 9780931036071
- Wrigley, Richard (17 October 2014), The Flâneur Abroad: Historical and International Perspectives, Cambridge Scholars Publishing, ISBN 978-1-4438-6981-2
