= Arsène Herbinier =

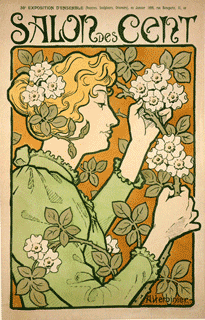
1897 Poster for an exhibition in the Salon des Cent by Arsène Herbinier

Arsène Julien Herbinier (14 May 1869 – 26 December 1947) was a French lithograph artist.

Herbinier was born in Paris in 1869, the son of Aimée Arsène Herbinier. He studied with Luc-Olivier Merson, Eugène Grasset and Alfred Jean Marie Broquelet. He specialized in lithography. His work was exhibited by the Société des Artistes Français, and in 1909 he was elected a full member of this society and awarded a third class medal. His works were typical of the Art Nouveau style, including the clear influence of Japanese prints and the sinuous lines, naturalistic motifs and pale female figures draped in flowing gowns.

He died in Vernon, Eure in 1947.
