= André des Gachons =

French painter and illustrator

André des Gachons (March 15, 1871 in Ardentes – July 13, 1951 in La Chaussée-sur-Marne) was a French painter and illustrator.

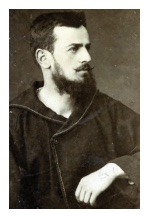
Portrait André des Gachons

He exhibited at the Salon des Gachons from 1892 and at the Salon des Cent from January 1895. His use of watercolors were delicate. From 1913, in La Chaussee-sur-Marne, he painted weather observations each day at regular times, small watercolors; more than 77,000 were sent to the weather service in Paris. With his brother Jacques, Gachons published "l’Album des légendes" (“Livre des légendes”), a collection of poems, tales and legends.
