= Georges de Feure =

Dutch-French painter (1868–1943)

- Georges Joseph van Sluijters
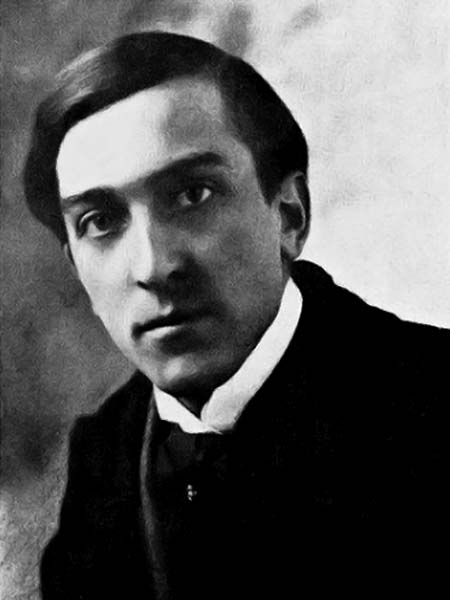
- Portrait photo
- Born: Georges Joseph van Sluijters; 6 September 1868; Paris
- Died: 26 November 1943; Paris
- Education: Rijksakademie van beeldende kunsten
- Occupations: Painter, designer, drawer, lithographer, sculptor, illustrator, graphic artist

Signature
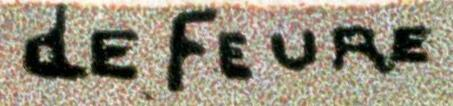

Georges de Feure (pseodonym of Georges Joseph van Sluijters; 6 September 1868 – 26 November 1943) was a Dutch-French painter, theatrical designer, and industrial art designer in the symbolism and Art Nouveau styles.

== Biography ==
Georges Joseph van Sluijters was born in 1868 in Paris, but in 1870 he moved to The Hague where he would grow up. His father was the affluent Dutch architect Jan Hendrik van Sluijters, and his mother was Belgian.

In 1886, de Feure was one of the eleven students admitted at the Rijksakademie van beeldende kunsten in Amsterdam, which he did however leave very quickly for Paris in 1889, since he felt that formal academic training had nothing to offer him. Being of very independent nature, de Feure never again took up formal artistic studies, and forged his own independent path. He was however influenced by Jules Chéret in his posters for the café concert but most likely was never his pupil and became the key designer of Siegfried Bing for L'Art Nouveau.

He showed work in the Exposition Universelle de Paris exhibition in 1900. He designed furniture, worked for newspapers, created theatre designs for Le Chat Noir cabaret and posters. In August 1901, de Feure was nominated Chevalier in the Legion of Honour for his contribution to the decorative arts. He died in poverty at the age of 75 years in Paris.

== Personal life ==
De Feure had two sons, Jean Corneille and Pierre Louis, in the early 1890s with his mistress Pauline Domec and a daughter with his first wife Marguerite Guibert (married 7 July 1897).

== Gallery ==
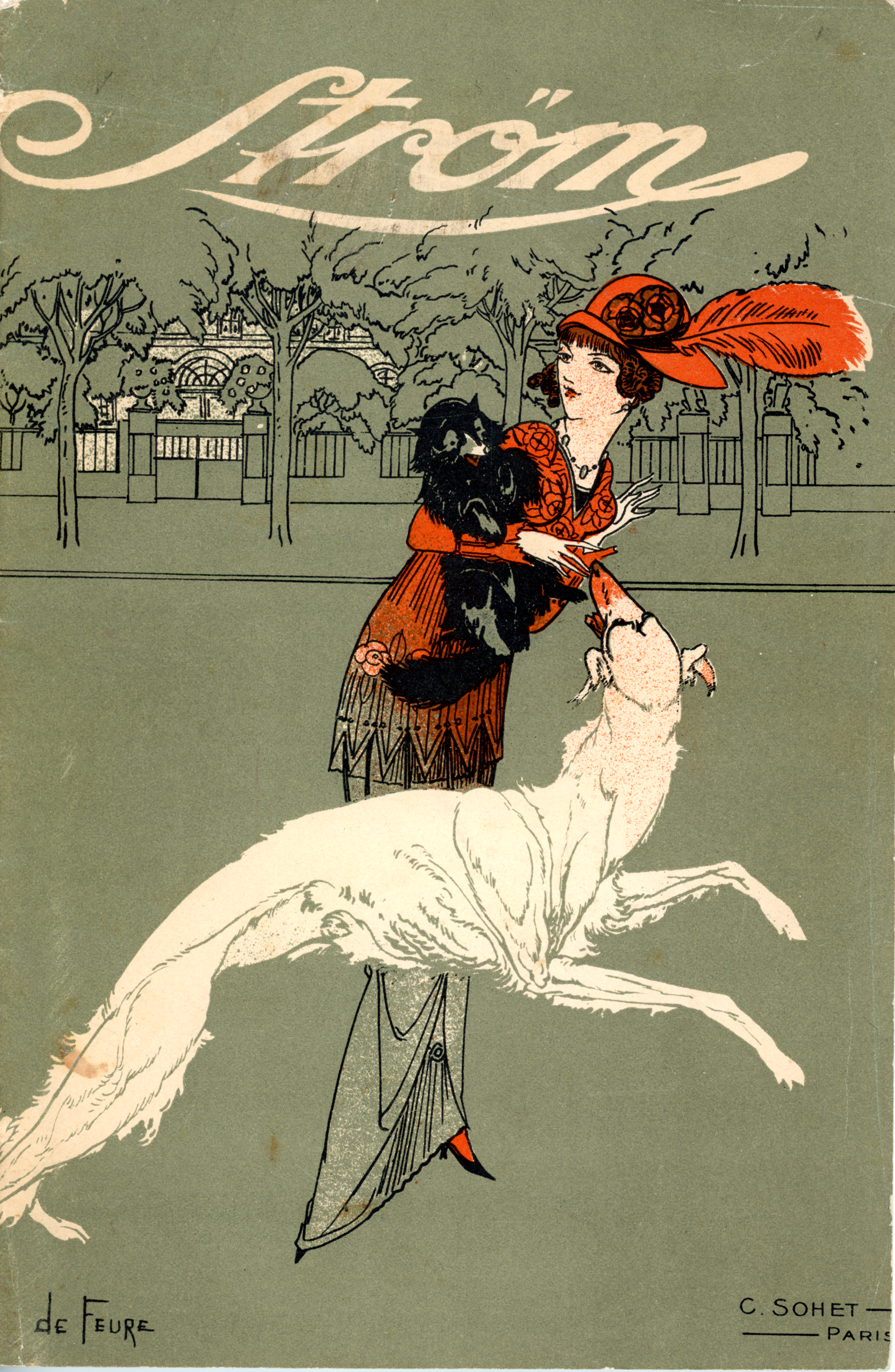
Fashion illustration - Ström Paris catalogue

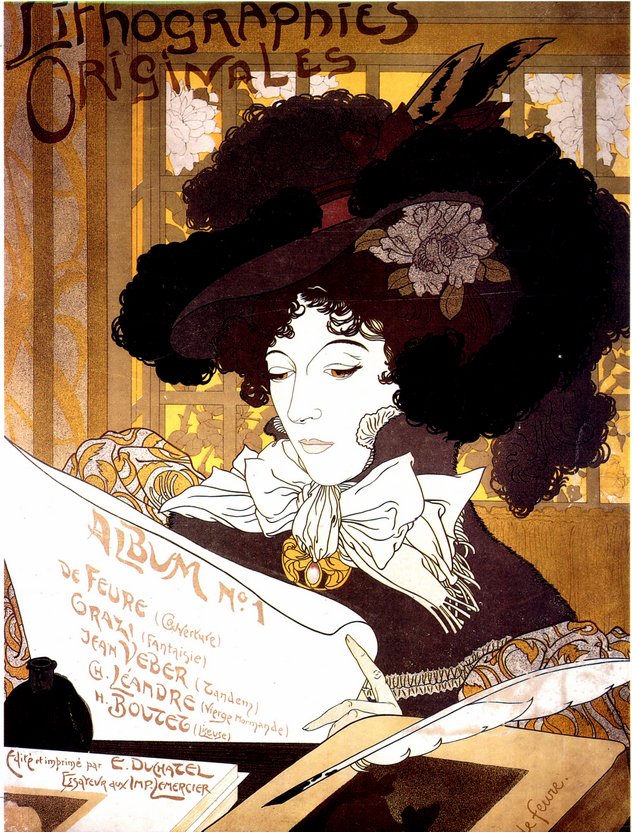
circa 1898

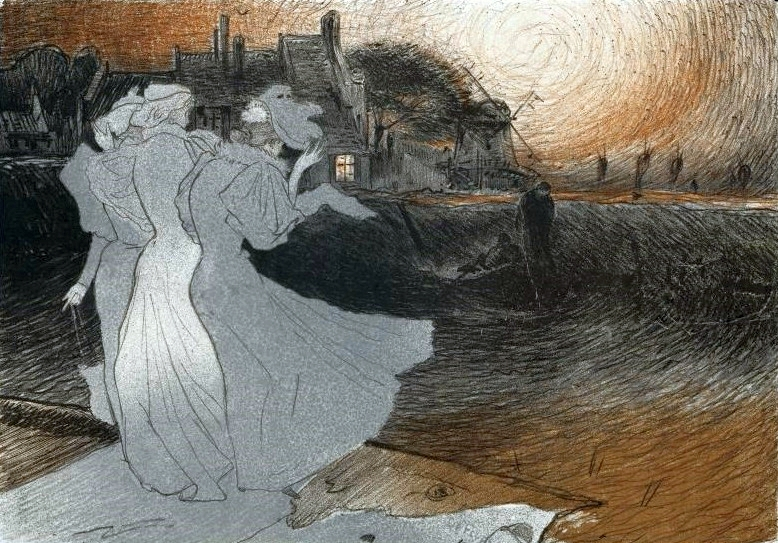
L'aventure, 1899 lithograph (National Museum, Warsaw)

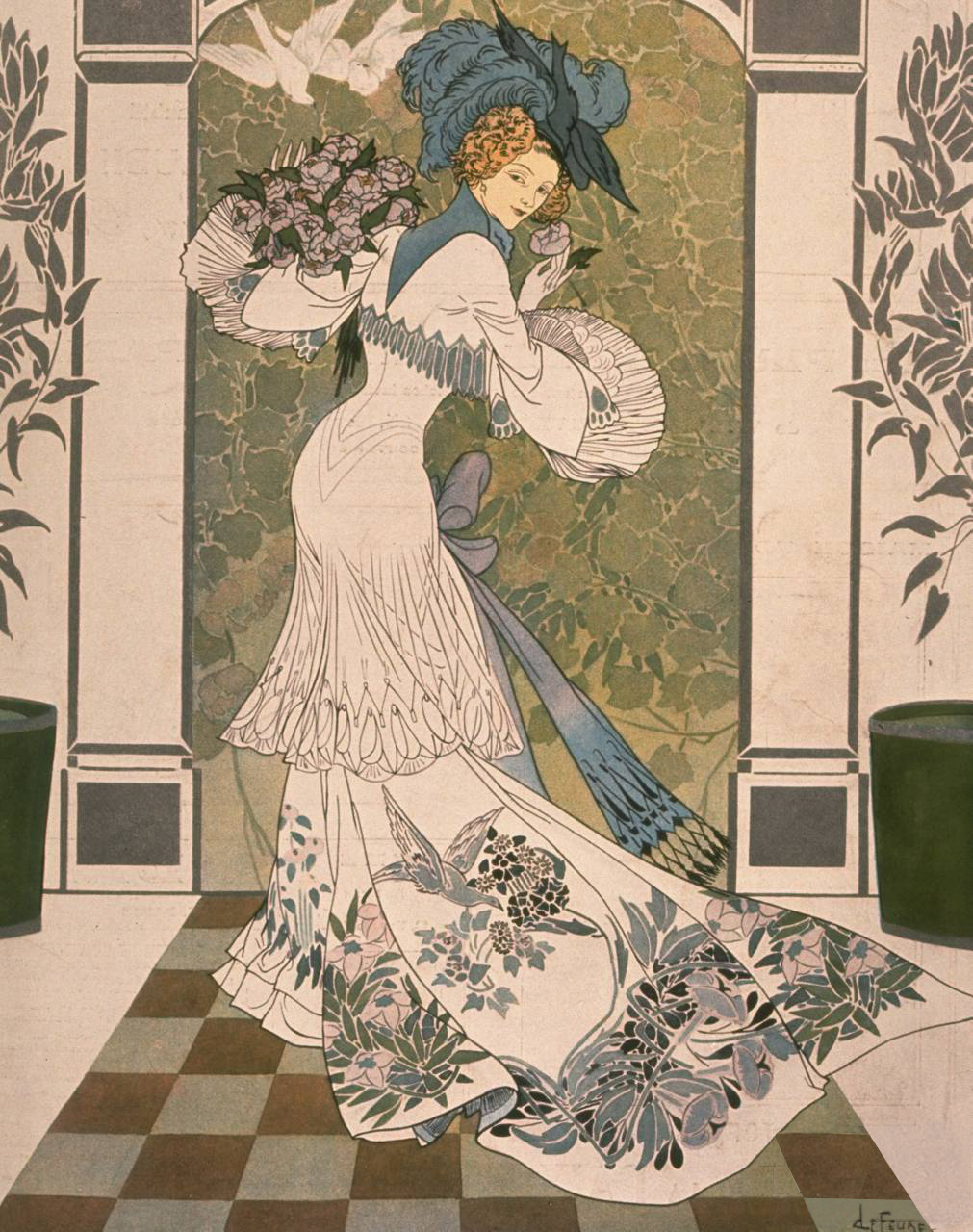
circa 1900

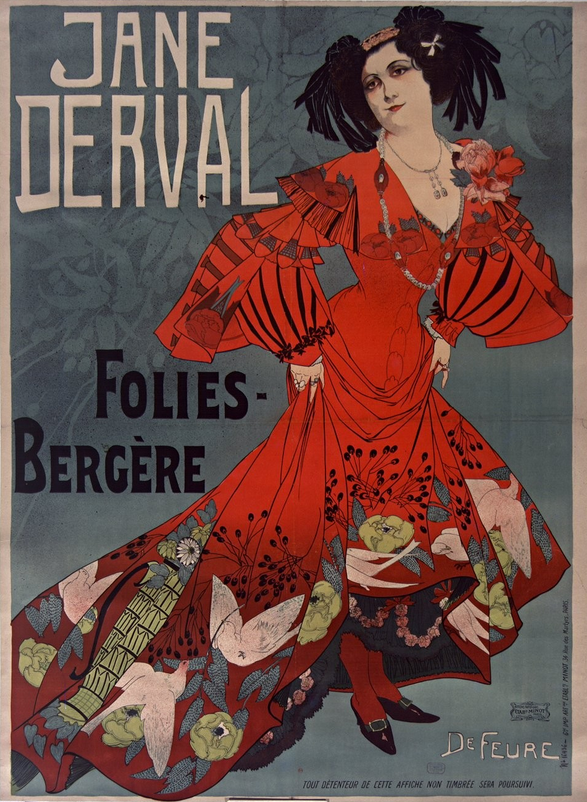
Jane Derval Folies Bergère (Paris, 1904)
Posters published in Les Maîtres de l'Affiche

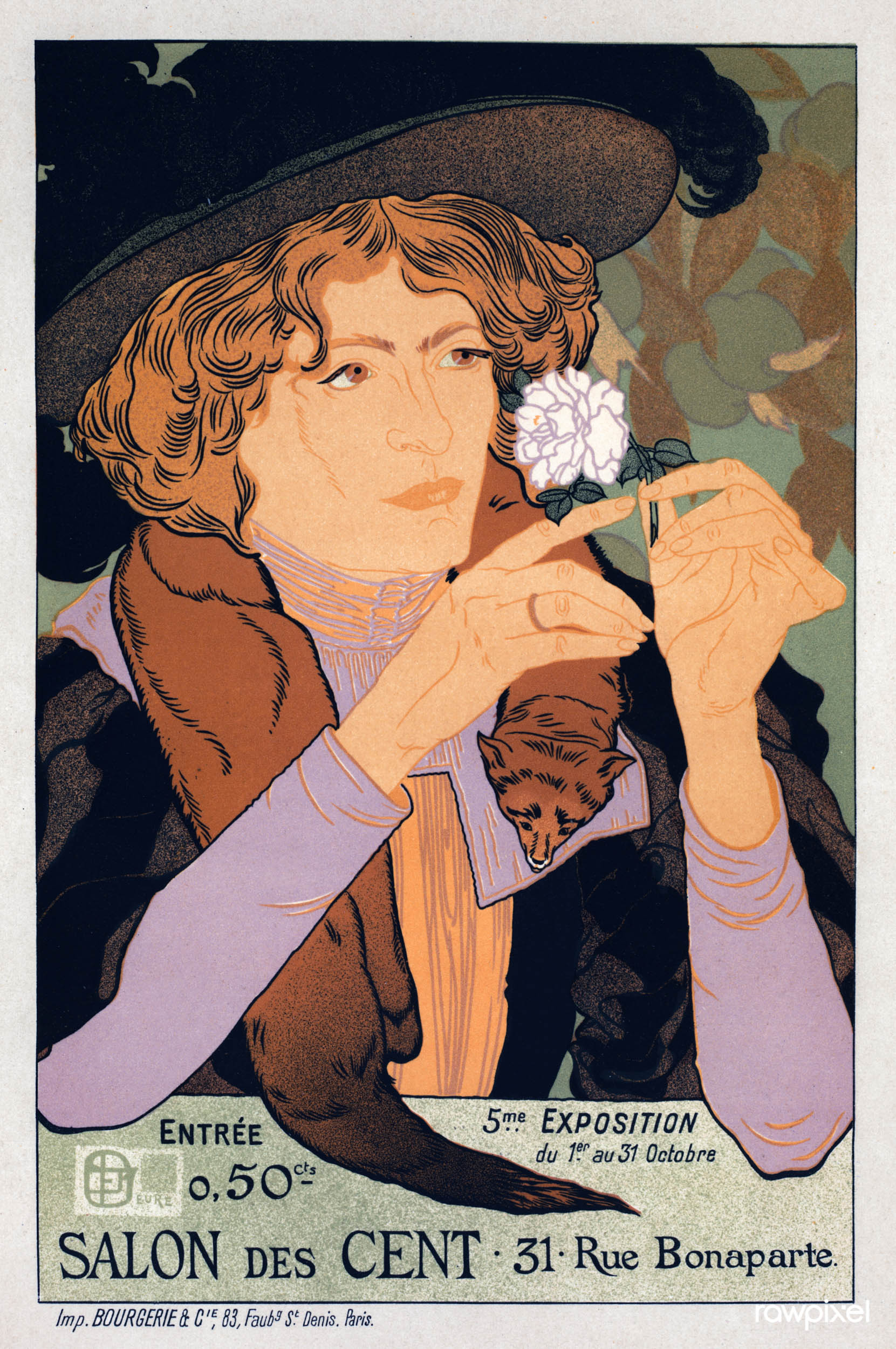
Plate 10

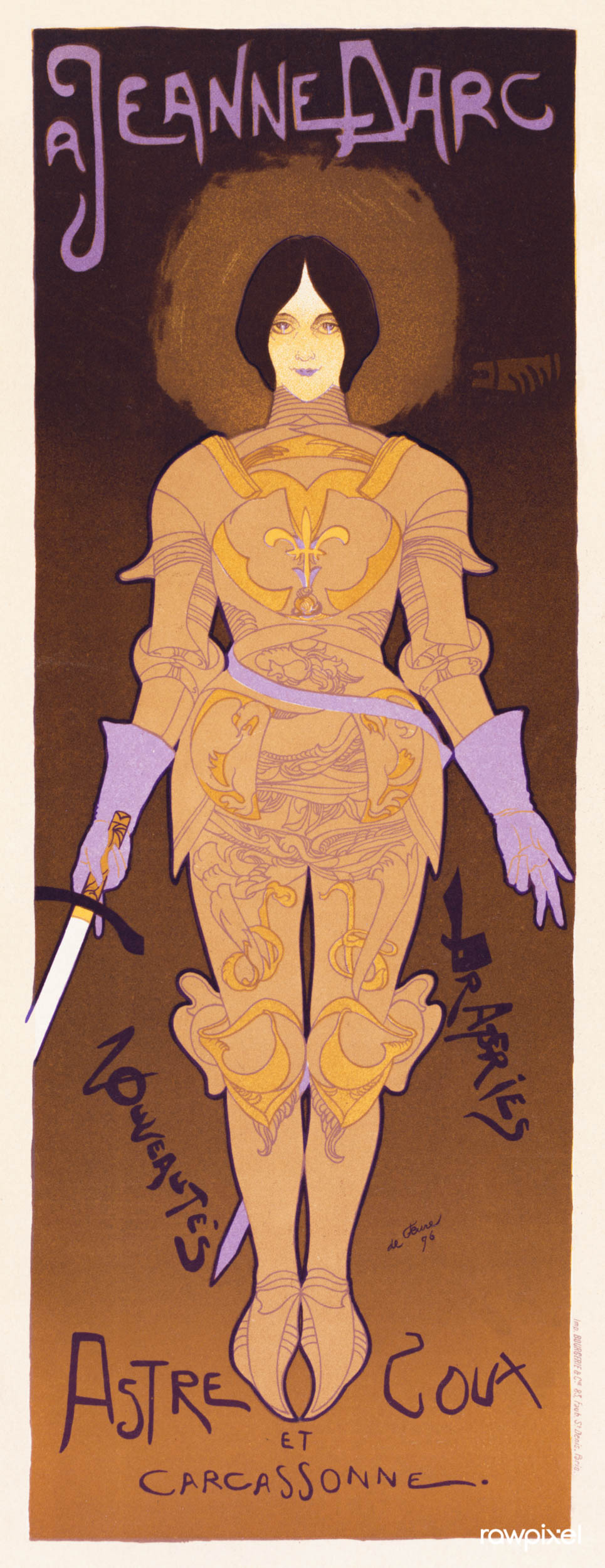
Plate 130

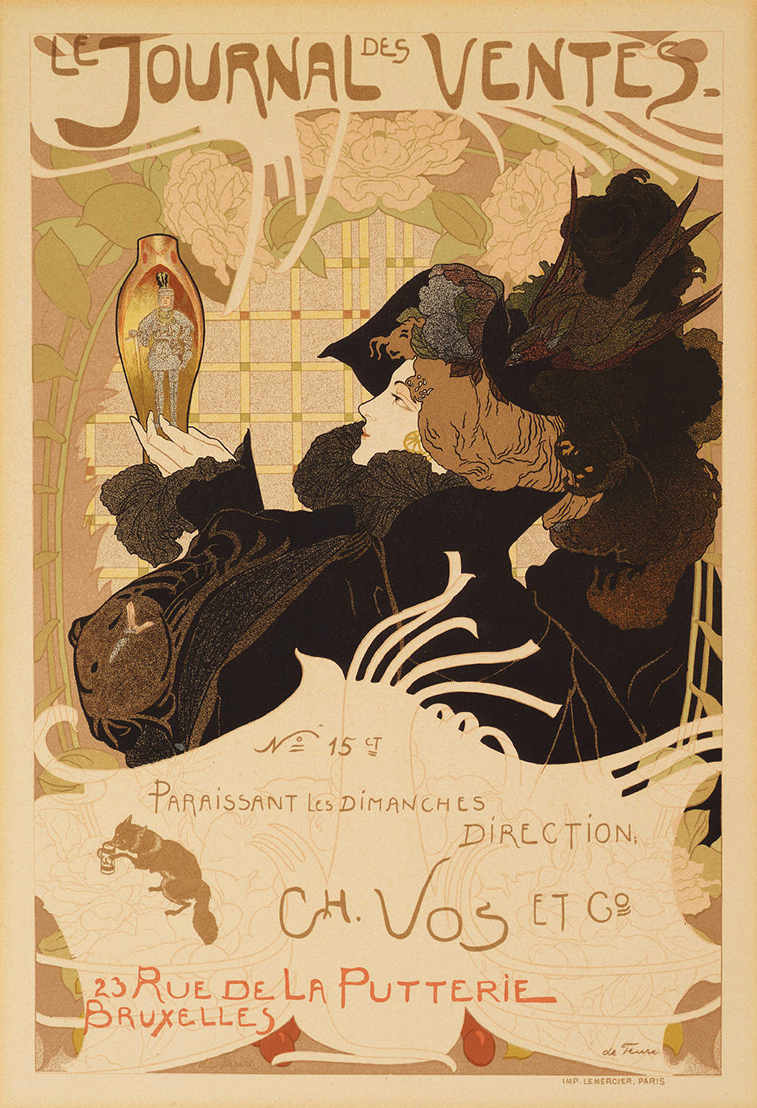
Plate 146

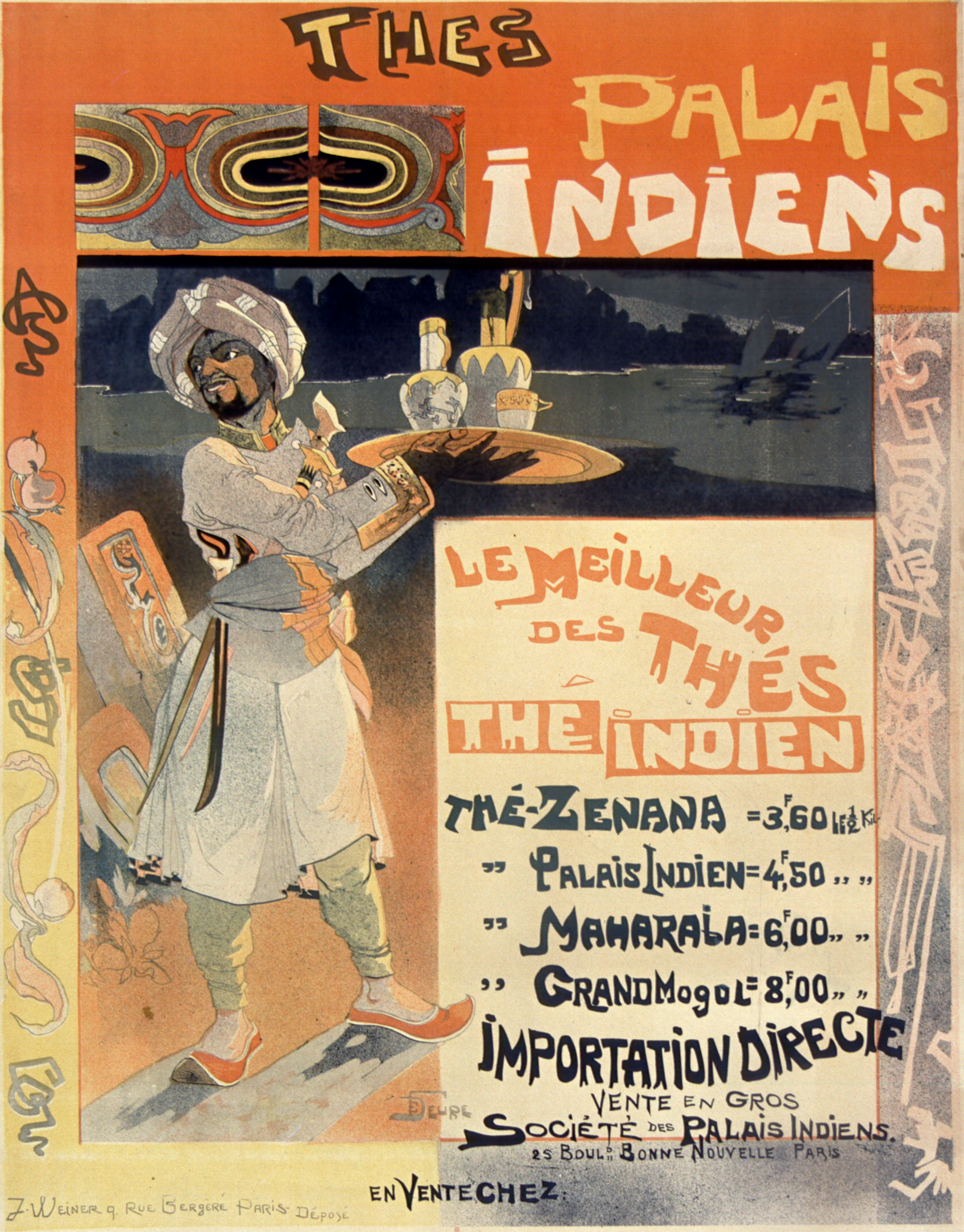
Plate 199
