= Berthon =

Berthon may refer to:

== People with the surname ==
- André Berthon (1882–1968), French politician
- Edward Lyon Berthon (1813 London–1899), English inventor and clergyman
- Eliot Berthon (born 1992), French ice hockey player
- Enzo Berthon (born 2000), French karateka
- George Théodore Berthon (1806–1892), French painter
- Laurie Berthon (born 1991), French track cyclist
- Nathanaël Berthon (born 1989), French racing driver
- Paul Berthon (1872–1909), French Art Nouveau artist
- Paul Émile Berthon (1846–?), French landscape painter
- René Théodore Berthon (1776–1859), French painter
- Stephen Berthon (1922–2007), English vice admiral

== Other ==
- Berthon Boat, lifeboat
