= Maria E. Beasley =

American entrepreneur and inventor (c. 1836–1913)

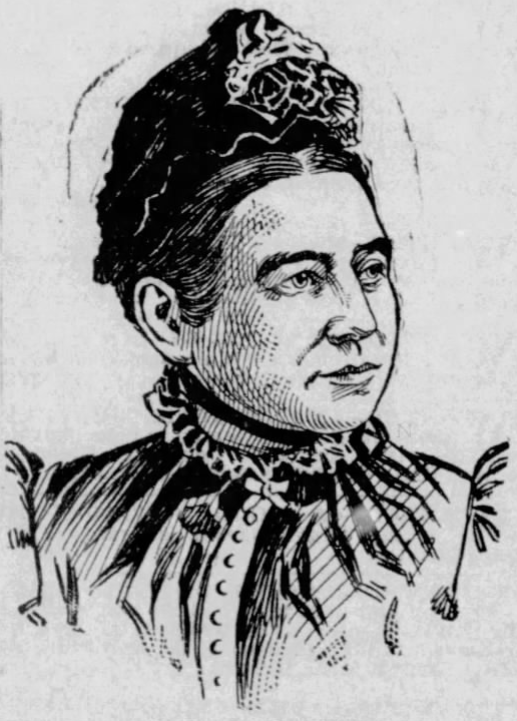
- Maria E. Beasley (1897)
- Born: Maria Hauser c. 1836; North Carolina, United States
- Died: 1913 (aged 76–77)
- Occupation(s): Entrepreneur, inventor
- Years active: c. 1878–1898
- Known for: Barrel-making machines and improvements to the life raft
- Spouse: John Q. Beasley
- Children: 2

Maria E. Beasley (née Hauser; c. 1836–1913) was an American entrepreneur and inventor. Born in North Carolina, Beasley grew up with a strong interest in mechanical work and learned about the profession of barrel-making from her grandfather. Between 1878 and 1898, she patented fifteen inventions in the United States: these included a footwarmer, an improved life raft, and an anti-derailment device for trains; however, her primary success as an inventor rose from a specialty in barrel-making machines and processes. Beasley licensed a patent to the Standard Oil Company, exhibited her work at the World's Industrial and Cotton Centennial Exposition and the World's Columbian Exposition, and founded two companies for the design and manufacture of barrels (one of which later sold for $1.4 million, the equivalent to $48,994,815 in 2024).

== Early life ==
Maria Hauser was born in about 1836 in North Carolina to a wealthy family. (Note: Stanley suggests that Maria was born in 1847, but the 1836 date is further supported by Maria's gravestone. Stanley also states that Maria's maiden name was Kenny, but published sources from the early 1900s give her maiden name as Hauser (which makes sense in connection with her grandfather, Jacob Hauser).) Her parents were Anna Johanna Spach and Christian Hauser, and Christian was a miller. Maria showed a keen interest in mechanics as a youth, and spent time familiarizing herself with her father's mill machinery and grandfather's distillery. At the age of thirteen, she built a small sailboat that was capable of safely transporting her and her dog. Additionally, she was known to create several functioning watermills on her own without assistance from anyone else. One of her grandfathers, Jacob Hauser, was a distillery owner in Kentucky, and when Maria visited him and his business she learned about the work of barrel-making and her grandfather's desperate need for a better method, which he had been known to travel as far as 1,000 miles in search of.

Maria married a North Carolina doctor named John Q. Beasley, (Note: While Stanley suggests that Maria married an Andrew Beasley in 1865, news articles and publications from Maria's lifetime refer to a Dr. John Q. Beasley.) taking his name. They had two sons: C. Oscar and Walter. Around 1861, just as the Civil War was beginning, John Q. became unwell. Maria Beasley moved the family to her grandfather's home in Kentucky (which he later bequeathed to her). They lived there for at least ten years. Beasley then decided there would be better educational opportunities for their sons further north, so she sold the land in Kentucky and moved the family again, this time to Philadelphia, Pennsylvania.

== Career ==
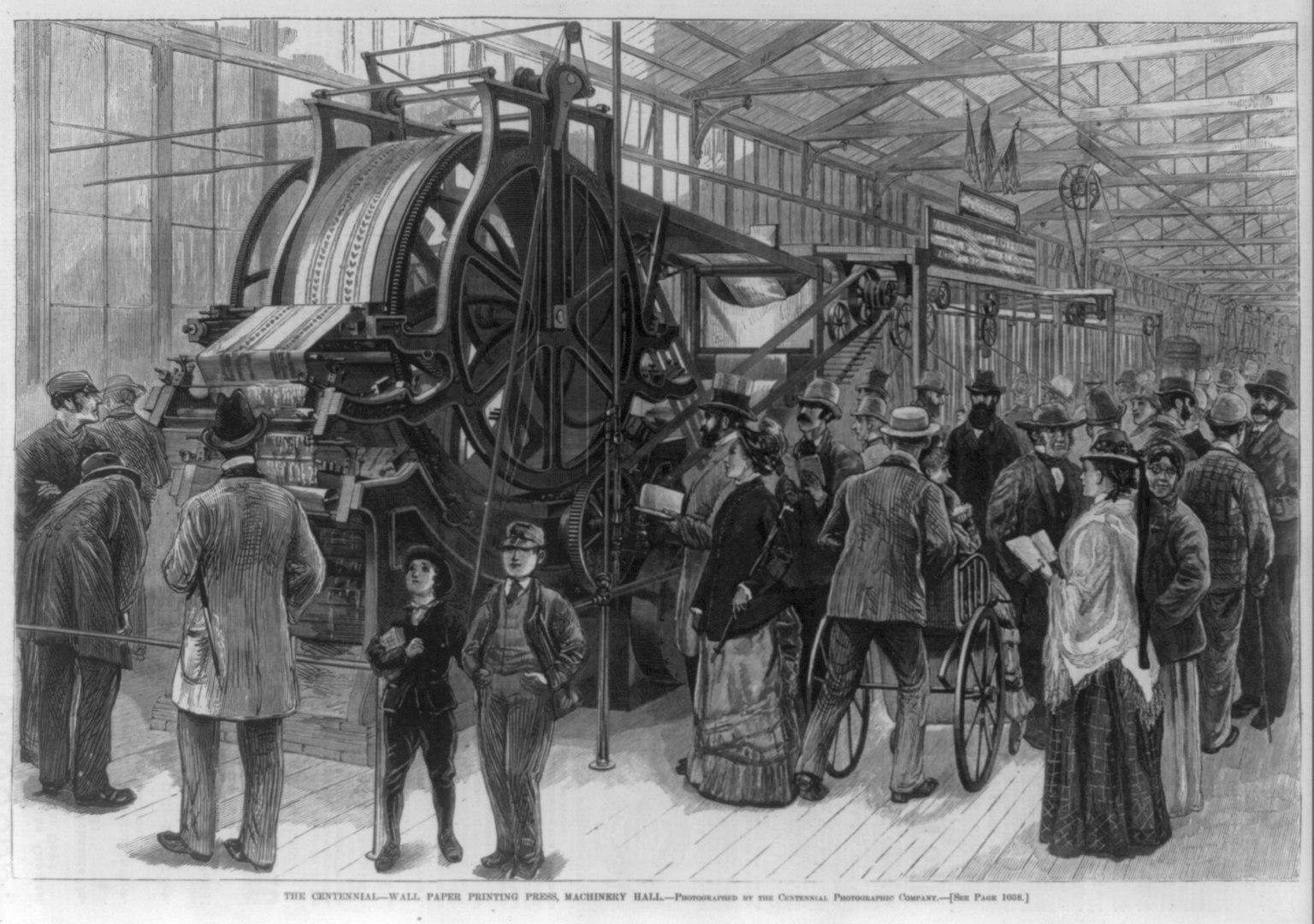
A wallpaper printing press was exhibited inside the Centennial Exposition's Machinery Hall in 1876 (where Beasley was a frequent visitor).

During her time in Philadelphia, Beasley listed her profession as "dressmaker" in city directories, but in 1876, when the Centennial Exposition opened in Philadelphia, Beasley became a frequent visitor to the exhibits in Machinery Hall. The experience motivated her to design her own inventions. In 1878 and 1879, she achieved her first patents: an improved footwarmer device and a roasting pan design.

In 1880, Beasley decided to pursue the invention of a new machine to more efficiently manufacture barrels. She visited different barrel-making businesses around the country to assess manufacturing procedures and concluded that the most difficult step was the task of placing hoops around the barrel staves. She patented a barrel-hooping machine in 1881 and 1882, which she displayed at the World's Industrial and Cotton Centennial Exposition in 1884. Her invention significantly impacted industrial barrel production (one machine could hoop up to 1,700 barrels per day), and her patent was licensed to the Standard Oil Company for $175 per month for a single machine. Beasley drew on this success and went on to invent at least five other barrel-related machines and industrial processes. As she continued to patent her inventions, she secured funding assistance by transferring partial rights to business partners. With the assistance of financial backers, she established the Beasley Standard Barrel Manufacturing Company in 1884, for which she was a majority shareholder. Seven years later, the company was acquired by the American Barrel and Stave Company for $1.4 million (equivalent to $48,994,815 in 2024).

By 1891, when she was living in Chicago, Beasley was formally advertising herself as an inventor, and she became a co-founder and director of the Wabash Avenue Subway Transportation Company, which had plans to build a new subway system in Chicago. A year prior, she had become a co-incorporator of the new Chicago Barrel company (a manufacturer of both barrels and barrel-related machinery) with an initial capital stock of $500,000. Beasley's innovations were exhibited at the World's Columbian Exposition in 1893, and her family was staunchly supporting her work: John Q. had become a patent agent to help market her designs, while their son Walter managed operations in her factory. Historian B. Zarina Khan notes that despite the laws of coverture (which gave men legal rights over their wives' earnings and possessions), John Q. explicitly signed away any claims he might have held over his wife's business transactions, consequently ensuring that her clients and partners could not abuse her legal status as a married woman to rescind on their agreements.

During the mid 1890s, Beasley became involved with studying the problem of how to successfully transport perishable goods across long distances by train. She believed the answer rested on improving the speed of trains through electrification, rather than relying on refrigerator cars to keep goods cool. She built a short experimental rail line around her property and began working out ways in which a train could be redesigned to support and withstand speeds of up to 100 miles per hour. In March 1895, James G. Hulse, Parker Crittenden and John W. Hill incorporated the Inter Ocean Electric Railway company with $200 million of capital (the largest capitalized stock incorporated in the West at the time), and the company announced its intention of building an elevated electric railway between New York, Chicago and San Francisco, with Beasley presented as the primary designer and motivational force behind a new and improved train. Her listed contributions included designing a more aerodynamically-shaped motor, a "telescopic glass" to assist train engineers in seeing further down the line, and a device to circulate cold water and air around the train axles, thus decreasing the risk of overheating incidents. She patented a "Means for preventing derailment of railroad-cars" in 1898.

Beasley patented a total of fifteen inventions in the United States, and obtained additional British patents for two of those works. Her other non-barrel related inventions included two patents for an improved life raft (1880 and 1882), a machine for pasting the upper parts of shoes (1882), a steam generator (1886), and a bread-making machine.

=== Inventions ===
==== Footwarmer ====
In 1878, Beasley patented her first innovation, a footwarmer. It uses a chamber of water that is heated by either the direct flame or heat from a lamp. Two pipes are used to clear the smoke generated by the lamp and the steam generated in the water heating chamber. The chamber of water lies directly underneath the upholstered surface upon which the user rests their feet. Due to the fire risk of the open flame of the lamp, Beasley mounts the lamps on small structural supports that can be moved in and out of the chamber through a door. The lamps also will right themselves if the footwarmer is overturned, further reducing the chance of a fire or explosion.

==== Barrel-hooping machine ====
Previously, all barrels were made by hand in a manual process. In 1880, after observing widespread advertisement for businesses desperately in search of barrel coopers, she asked her son, Oscar, whether there was any available machine that would make barrels and remove the need for coopers. After hearing that there wasn't, she became determined to create a solution and began brainstorming designs for a barrel-hooping machine capable of reliably and efficiently hooping wood together to create barrels.

In 1881, Beasley won her first patent for a barrel-hooping machine, followed by a second version of the patent (including one filed in the United Kingdom) in 1882. Her machine is designed to fit hoops tightly onto both sides of the barrel simultaneously, using two reciprocating heads, firmly-secured "hooping-toes" to guide the hoops, and a combination of springs, screws and levers. Her updated patent aims to account for differences and imperfections in the shape of barrel staves and hoops; it uses radially-adjustable arms and jaws to hold materials more firmly in place. The final design was capable of hooping 1,600-1,700 barrels per day, far more than a barrel cooper could hoop on their own.

By 1912, Beasley's barrel-hooping patent had been generating $20,000 in annual royalties (equivalent to $651,655 in 2024) – much of it from oil and sugar refineries with whom the invention had become popular.

Aside from her two barrel-hooping machines, Beasley also patented at least five other barrel-related innovations: a process for making barrels (1886), two barrel-making machines (1884 and 1888), a machine for setting up barrels (1888), and a process for notching and cutting hoops (1891).

==== Life raft design ====
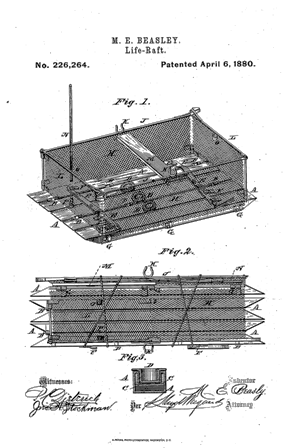
Beasley's first life raft patent, April 6, 1880

Beasley was awarded two patents for an improved life raft, one in 1880 and the other in 1882. Beasley’s raft uses a base of collapsible metal floats that is more flexible and makes storage on board a ship easier, also including airtight containers to protect perishable provisions. In her updated design, she makes it so that the raft can be used reversibly with greater ease (in case of accidental overturning) by adjusting the surface of the metal floats and including an adjustable guardrail.

Although some internet sources claim that Beasley's life rafts were used on the RMS Titanic in 1912, saving approximately 700 lives, author David H. Cropley challenges the credibility of this claim. The Titanic carried lifeboats, not life rafts. While four of the ship's lifeboats used collapsible canvas designs, they do not appear to be based on Beasley's design, and, regardless, the small number of collapsible lifeboats would not have been enough to save the hundreds of passengers cited in the stories. The collapsible lifeboats on board Titanic could be more accurately compared to the Berthon Boat which was designed by Edward Lyon Berthon after he survived the sinking of the PS Orion (1847) in 1850.

==== Anti-derailment device for trains ====
In 1898, Beasley was awarded a patent for a "Means for preventing derailment of railroad-cars". As higher train speeds were now attainable by the use of electric power, train tracks needed additional safeguards to reduce the possibility of derailment. Beasley's anti-derailment device is a combination of a guardrail and locking device. The guardrail uses a strong top flange (a protruding edge or rim), located at the inner side of the track rail, which engages with a detent (a mechanical catch) connected to the train. In the event of a train car about to derail, the detent and flange prevent the car from leaving the track and restore regular motion. The detent must be rigidly framed in position to avoid the risk of straining and being wrenched from its fastenings.

== Death ==
Beasley died in 1913. (Note: Year of death has also been suggested as 1904, but Beasley's gravestone further supports the 1913 date.)

== See also ==
- List of inventors
- List of women innovators and inventors by country
