= Romsey =

Market town in Hampshire, England

Coordinates: 50°59′20″N 1°29′48″W

- Market town and civil parish
- Romsey Corn Exchange

- Location within Hampshire
- Population: 20,746 (2021 Census)
- Civil parish: Romsey
- District: Test Valley
- Shire county: Hampshire
- Region: South East
- Country: England
- Sovereign state: United Kingdom
- Post town: ROMSEY
- Postcode district: SO51
- Dialling code: 01794
- Police: Hampshire and Isle of Wight
- Fire: Hampshire and Isle of Wight
- Ambulance: South Central
- UK Parliament: Romsey and Southampton North
- Website: Romsey Town Council

Romsey (/ˈrɒmzi/ ROM-zee) is a market town and civil parish in the Test Valley district of Hampshire, England. The town is situated 7 miles (11 km) northwest of Southampton, 11 miles (18 km) southwest of Winchester and 17 miles (27 km) southeast of Salisbury. It sits on the outskirts of the New Forest, just over 3 miles (4.8 km) northeast of its eastern edge. The population of the parish of Romsey was 20,746 at the 2021 census.

Romsey is one of the principal towns in the Test Valley borough and lies on the River Test, which is known for fly fishing, predominantly trout. In 2019, the town centre underwent substantial remodelling, removing the roundabout around the statue of Lord Palmerston, and creating a pedestrianised area.

Romsey was home to the 17th-century philosopher and economist William Petty and the 19th-century British prime minister, Lord Palmerston, whose statue has stood in the town centre since 1857. The town was also home to the 20th-century naval officer and statesman Louis Mountbatten, 1st Earl Mountbatten of Burma, who lived at Broadlands. Romsey Abbey, the largest parish church in Hampshire, dominates the centre of the town. Other notable buildings include a 13th-century hunting lodge, an 18th-century coaching inn and the 19th-century corn exchange.

== History ==
=== Middle Ages to the Civil War ===
==== Beginnings ====
The first church in Romsey was founded by Edward the Elder in 907 AD for his daughter, Ælflæd, a nun who became the first abbess of Romsey. Edgar the Peaceful re-founded the abbey under the Rule of Benedict in 967 AD, appointing as abbess a noblewoman named Merewenna in 974 AD. Merewenna was given charge of Edgar's stepdaughter, Æthelflæd, who later served as abbess herself. Both Merewenna and Æthelflæd are revered as saints.

The surrounding village prospered alongside the religious community. In 1003 the Danes sacked Romsey and destroyed the Anglo-Saxon church in retaliation for the St Brice's Day massacre. While there is no record of the abbey's restoration, it is written that in 1012 Emma of Normandy gave lands to the abbey and that there were a total of 54 nuns in Romsey during the reign of Cnut the Great.

The Domesday Book of 1086 refers to a population of 127 households in Romsey, along with the earliest records of the watermills that would later establish it as an industrial town. Relative to other Domesday settlements, Romsey had a large population and paid a considerable amount of tax.

Along with Wilton Abbey nearby, Romsey Abbey became known as a place of learning in the High Middle Ages. In 1086, Matilda of Scotland was sent there to be educated by her aunt, Cristina, who was then the abbess. A number of hopeful suitors visited the princess in Romsey, including the later king William Rufus, whose advances were hindered by her aunt. William was killed in 1100 while hunting in the New Forest, after which his body was carried through Bell Street in Romsey on its way to Winchester Cathedral.

The existing abbey was built in the Norman style between 1120 and 1140 using Chilmark stone. It was likely designed by Henry of Blois, the brother of King Stephen and builder of the Hospital of St Cross in Winchester. The final three arches were added between 1230 and 1240, at which time more than 100 nuns belonged to the foundation. The north transept of the original Saxon church is still visible today.

Henry I granted Romsey its first charter, allowing it to hold a full market each Sunday and a four-day fair at the Feast of St Æthelflæd the Virgin. This was confirmed by Henry II in 1268 and extended to the Feast of St Philip and St James by Henry III in 1272. Given these charters, it can be assumed that Romsey was flourishing in the 13th century, perhaps supported by a lucrative woollen industry whereby wool was woven and then fulled or pounded before being dyed and exported from nearby Southampton. It is suggested that towns like Romsey and New Alresford prospered as a result of their location, which allowed them to exploit the downland sheep economy while retaining access to a major port to the south.

Romsey continued to grow and prosper until the Black Death struck the town in 1348–9, killing up to half its population of roughly 1,000 individuals. It is recorded that 90 nuns voted in the 1333 abbatial election but never more than 25 in elections held from 1350 onwards. Plague arrived again in 1526, with Henry VIII abandoning his plans to spend the eve of the Assumption in Romsey and instead heading to Winchester. Prosperity never returned to the abbey.

Romsey Abbey was finally suppressed by Henry VIII upon the dissolution of the monasteries in 1539, during which time many religious buildings were destroyed. The abbey itself was saved from demolition, ostensibly due to a section dedicated to St Lawrence that was used as the parish church. In 1544, the townspeople were allowed to purchase the abbey from the Crown for a sum of £100. The section that saved it was subsequently demolished, however, with the remainder being used as the parish church that exists today.

By the mid-16th century Romsey's population was about 1,500, its woollen and tanning industries having fuelled growth. After his visit to Broadlands in 1607, James I granted the town a charter and made it a borough. This gave official status to an informal local government that had been running the town's affairs since the Dissolution in 1539. Romsey could now have a corporation comprising a mayor, six aldermen, twelve chief burgesses and a town clerk. There was also to be a local law court under a Court Recorder assisted by two sergeants-at-mace and, over all, a High Steward, the first of whom was the Earl of Southampton.

Romsey changed hands several times during the English Civil War, with both Royalist and Parliamentary troops occupying and plundering the town. Most significant were the events of 1643 in which William Waller, having captured Winchester, marched southwest to Romsey where his soldiers defaced the abbey and destroyed its organ. A skirmish on Middle Bridge, downstream of Sadler's Mill, may have preceded these events.

=== 18th to 20th centuries ===
The town's woollen industry struggled through the 18th century, with competition from the North effectively halving the wages of woollen workers in the southern and eastern parts of the country by the 1770s. As the townspeople looked for more stable work in burgeoning industries like brewing, papermaking and sackmaking, Romsey continued to grow as a modern market town. In 1794 a canal was dug from Redbridge to Andover, passing through Romsey and thus improving its access to nearby trade centres. The town's population was 4,274 in the first census of 1801.

Lord Palmerston, the 19th-century British prime minister, lived at Broadlands in his autumn years. In the 1850s he delivered a number of political and religious lectures about the town, including one to the Labourers' Encouragement Society in 1859. Though he had hoped to be buried at Romsey Abbey, he was in 1865 given a state funeral and subsequently buried at Westminster Abbey. His statue, sculpted by Matthew Noble, has stood in Market Place since 1868.

Despite the arrival of the railway in 1847, the town's expansion slowed in the mid-19th century. Whilst its population had grown to 5,654 in 1851, it stagnated in subsequent decades and—by the time of the 1901 census—the population was just 5,597. The town also enjoyed a significant trade in corn: the Corn Exchange, which is a Grade II* listed building, was completed in 1864.

In the 19th and 20th centuries, Romsey became known for making Berthon Boats, a type of collapsible lifeboat invented by Edward Lyon Berthon in 1851. In 1873, having been the vicar of Romsey Abbey since 1860, Berthon erected a shed outside the nearby vicarage to meet the increasing demand for collapsible boats in the 1870s. In 1877 he appointed his son as manager and moved the enterprise to Lortemore Place. The boatyard continued to make boats until 1917, when it became Berthon Boat Co. and relocated to Lymington. The abbey installed a window commemorating Berthon in 1902.

With Romsey's expansion as a brewing town in the mid-19th century, it became known for its extraordinary number of pubs and, more generally, its fashionable drinking culture. By 1911 it had more than 80 public houses, twice the national average and effectively one pub for every 151.5 residents. Based on the old Hampshire saying so drunk he must have been to Romsey, a book of the same name was published in 1974 as a comprehensive guide to the town's drinking establishments.

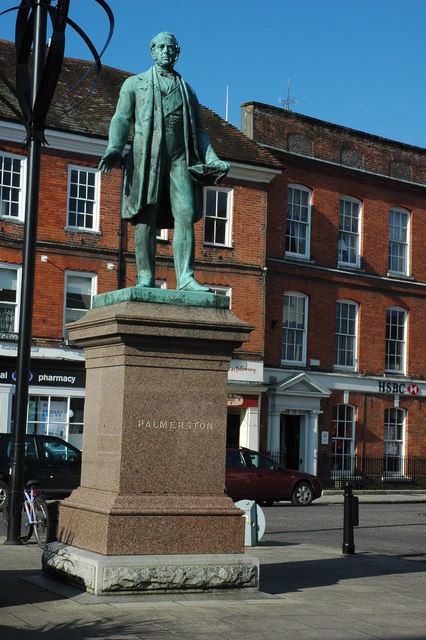
Statue of Lord Palmerston

The Willis Fleming family of North Stoneham Park were major landowners at Romsey from the 17th until early 20th centuries, and were lords of the manors of Romsey Infra and Romsey Extra.

Broadlands later became the home of Louis Mountbatten, 1st Earl Mountbatten of Burma, known locally as 'Lord Louis'. In 1947 he was given his earldom and the lesser title of Baron Romsey, of Romsey in the County of Southampton. Mountbatten was buried in Romsey Abbey after being killed in an IRA bomb explosion in Ireland on 27 August 1979. After his death his titles passed to his elder daughter, Lady Brabourne, who thus became Countess Mountbatten of Burma. Her eldest son was styled by the courtesy title 'Lord Romsey' until he inherited the title of Lord Brabourne in 2005, and then the earldom in 2017.

Prince Philip, Duke of Edinburgh was Mountbatten's nephew and, when he married Elizabeth II on 20 November 1947, the pair departed London by train and spent their honeymoon at Broadlands. They attended the service at Romsey Abbey the following Sunday. Like his parents, Charles, Prince of Wales and his first wife Diana, Princess of Wales spent the first part of their own honeymoon at Broadlands in 1981.

In 2007 Romsey celebrated the 400th anniversary of James I's charter with a programme of events hosted from March through to September, including a visit on 8 June from Elizabeth II and the Duke of Edinburgh. The cost of the visit created some local controversy, with particular attention being paid to the £5,000 spent on a new toilet for Her Majesty's use, though in the event she did not make use of it.

=== Present ===
The town centre has had a large Waitrose supermarket since 1969, along with an independent department store named Bradbeers and a range of other independent shops and high street chains. Romsey was described by The Guardian as 'resoundingly, timelessly English' in 2014, with the newspaper remarking on the town's representation of bourgeois provincial life. It is popular among retirees.

Three industrial and trading estates focus mainly on service industries and small-scale manufacturing. Three scientific and high technology employers—Roke Manor Research, Southampton Science Park and IBM—have establishments nearby.

== Governance ==
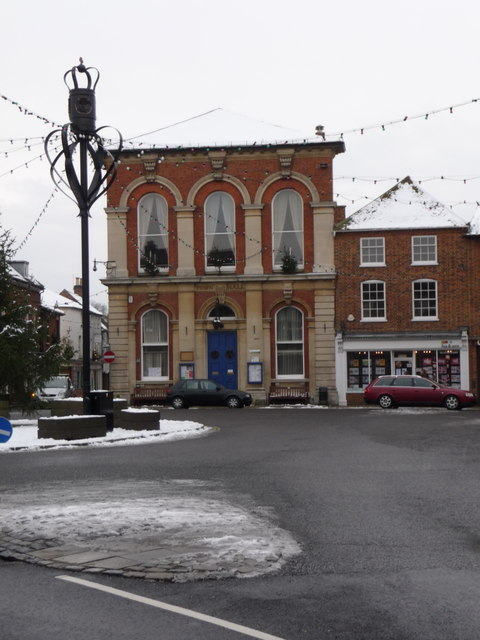
Romsey Town Hall

Romsey is part of the Romsey and Southampton North parliamentary constituency. Its current MP is Caroline Nokes of the Conservative Party. Elected in the general election on 6 May 2010, after boundary changes, she defeated the Liberal Democrat MP Sandra Gidley with a 4.5% swing to Conservative from Liberal Democrat and a majority of 4,156 votes. Gidley had held the seat since a by-election in 2000 in the former Romsey seat.

The town is part of the Test Valley district council which is controlled by the Conservative Party. Norton Knatchbull, 3rd Earl Mountbatten of Burma, grandson of Louis Mountbatten, 1st Earl Mountbatten of Burma, is the current High Steward, a position which dates from the 17th century (see above).

Romsey Town Council holds its meetings and has its offices at Romsey Town Hall.

== Places of interest ==
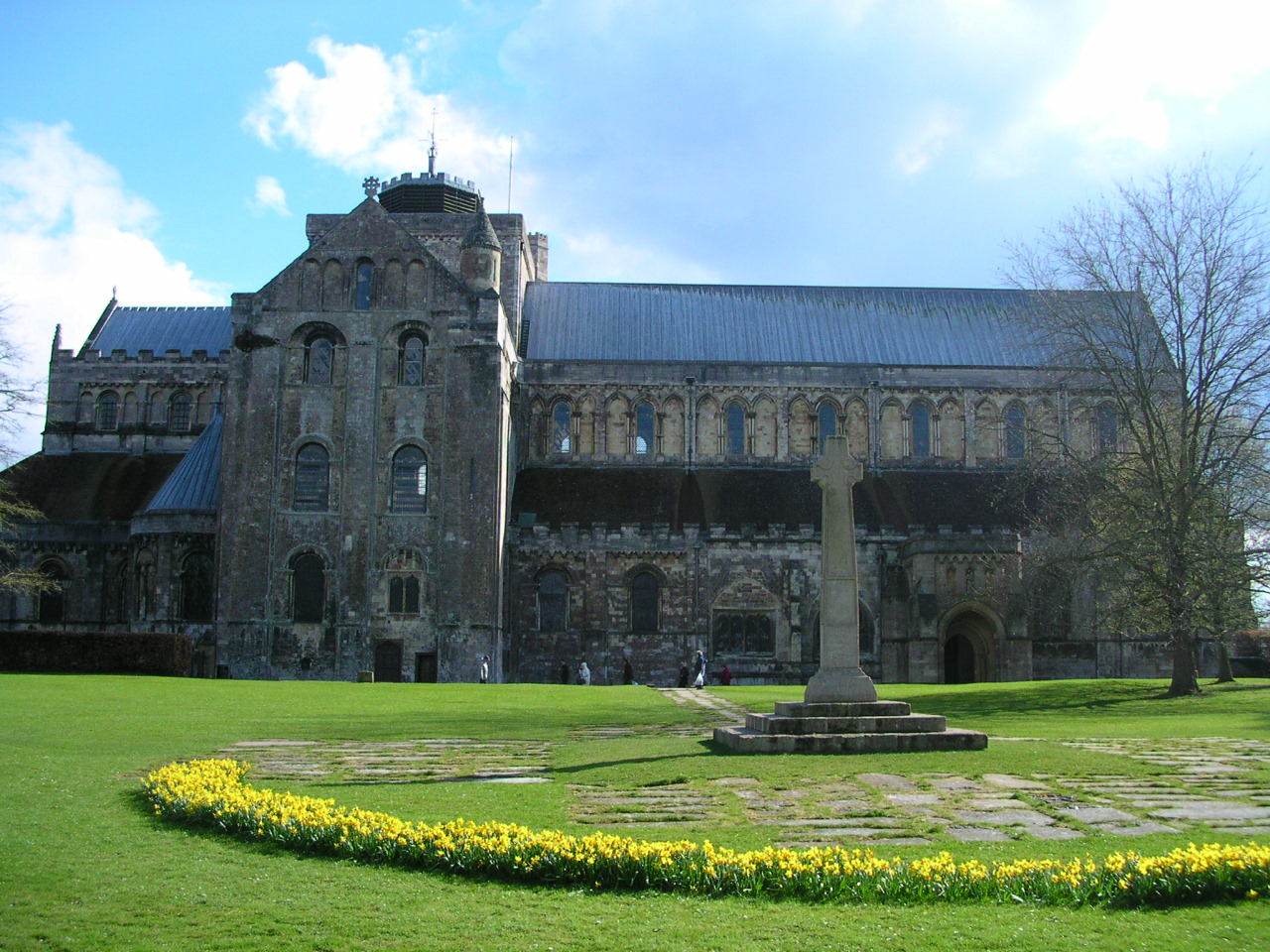
Romsey Abbey and Celtic cross

=== Romsey Abbey ===
Romsey Abbey is a 12th-century abbey built in the Norman style, probably by Henry of Blois, upon an earlier Saxon church dating back to the 10th century. Elements of the old Saxon church remain, including an exposed north transept and a 10th-century rood. The current abbey is the largest parish church in Hampshire and is generally regarded as cathedral-like by architects and observers. It is open daily to visitors.

=== Broadlands ===
Broadlands is an 18th-century country house located just outside the town centre. It was designed in the Palladian style by the famous architect Capability Brown before being completed by Henry Holland in 1788. It has had a number of illustrious occupants, including Lord Palmerston and Louis Mountbatten. Broadlands has been the setting of two royal honeymoons, namely those of Elizabeth II and Prince Philip in 1947 and then Prince Charles and Princess Diana in 1981. The house itself is a Grade I listed building and the surrounding gardens are Grade II listed on the Register of Historic Parks and Gardens. Both are open to visitors on weekday afternoons in summer.

=== King John's House ===
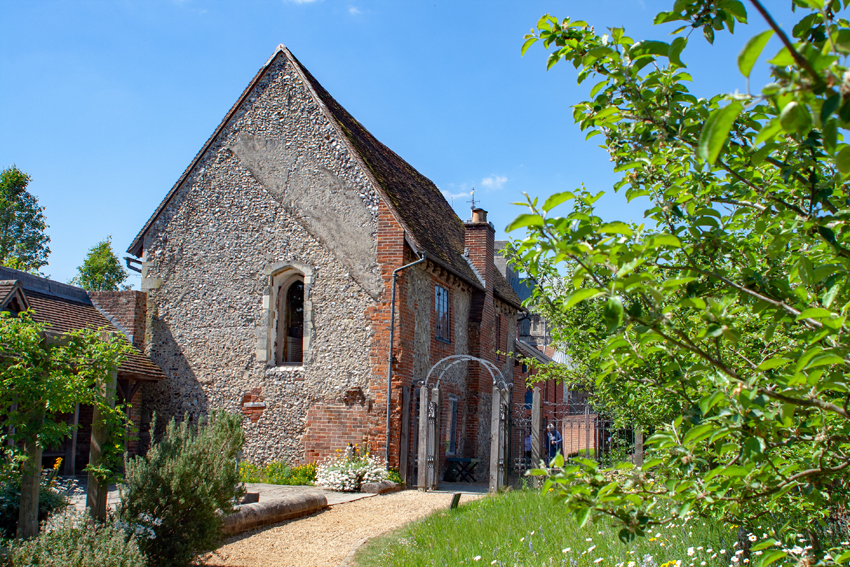
King John's House, Romsey

King John's House is a 13th-century building that allegedly served as a hunting lodge for King John when he hunted in the nearby New Forest. This is unlikely, however, since it was built in 1256 and therefore 40 years after the king's death, though there is evidence that the beams were reused from an earlier structure. The original building and adjoining Tudor cottage have a number of unusual historical features, including 14th-century wall decorations and graffiti, a floor made from cattle metapodials, and a traditional monastic garden. Locals claim the house is haunted, with the Hampshire Ghost Society encountering a shrouded figure during their investigations between 2002 and 2008. The house is a Grade I listed building.

In February 2025 the building was damaged by fire.

=== Embley Park ===
Embley Park, a country estate located on the outskirts of Romsey, was the home of Florence Nightingale from 1825 to her death in 1910. Known as the founder of modern nursing and for her work in sanitary reform, Nightingale is said to have received her calling from God in 1837 whilst sitting beneath a large cedar tree on the grounds. While a manor in Embley belonged to Romsey Abbey as early as the 10th century, the current building is of 18th- and 19th-century origin. The site is now home to Embley, an independent school. It is a Grade II listed building.

=== The White Horse Hotel ===
The White Horse Hotel is a Grade II listed, 18th-century coaching inn whose timber frames date back to the 1450s. Its medieval stone cellars indicate that the site may have hosted guests to Romsey Abbey as early as the 12th century. The existing assembly rooms are said to be where Lord Palmerston first engaged in political debate in the early 1800s. The building houses a hotel and brasserie.

=== Sadler's Mill ===
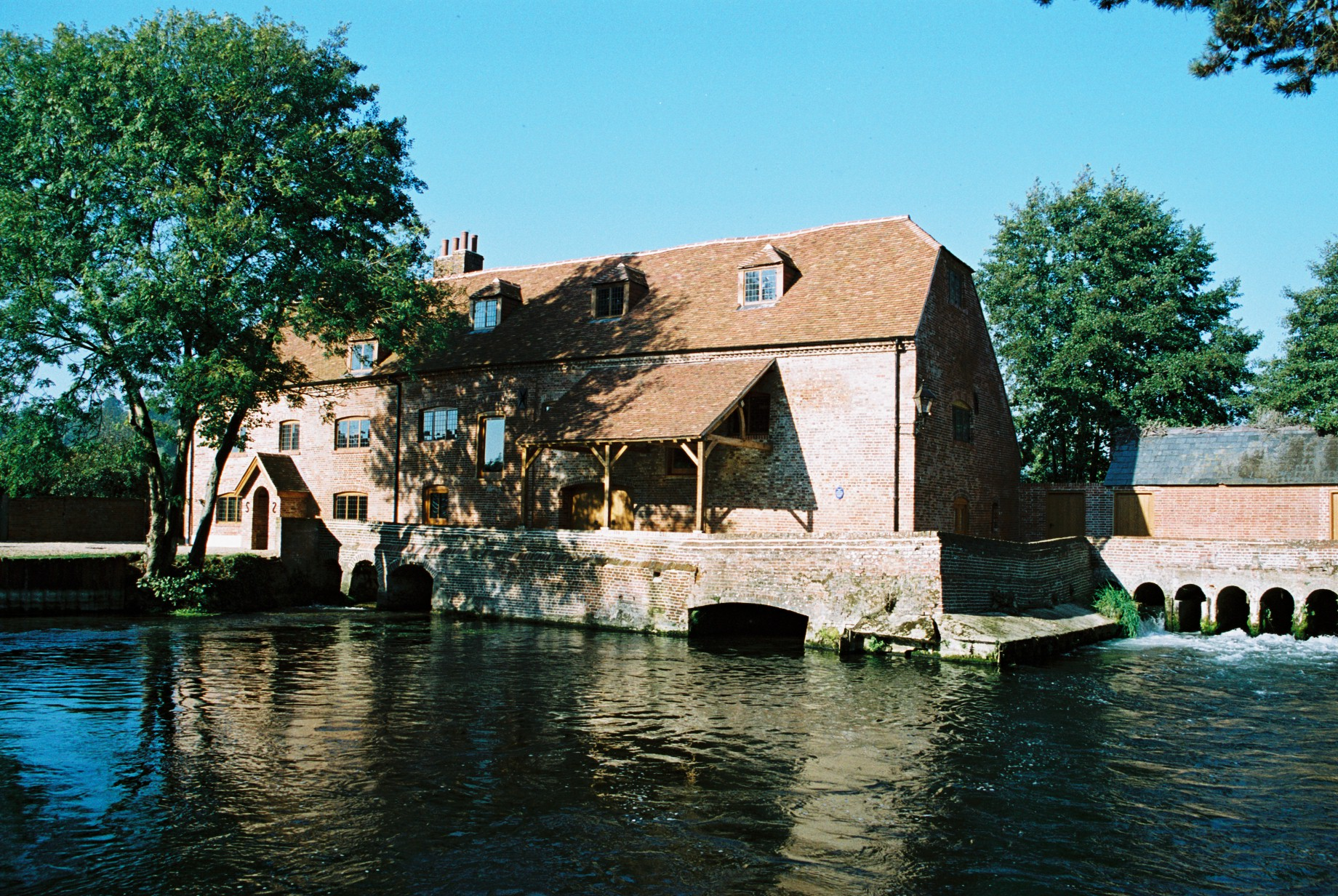
Sadler's Mill

The existence of Sadler's Mill, the only mill to be developed on the main course of the River Test, is first recorded in the 16th century, when it functioned as a corn and grist mill. It was at one time owned by Lord Palmerston and later the Broadlands estate before passing to various private owners. Milling ceased in 1932 and the building was left derelict for many years until its restoration in 2005. Carbon dating during this restoration placed the earlier structure in the mid-17th century. It is a Grade II listed building.

=== The Plaza ===
The Plaza, in Winchester Road, is a fully equipped 230-seat art deco style theatre, originally built as a cinema in the 1930s. It became a bingo hall until the 1980s. It was converted in 1984 and is now home to local amateur dramatics group, Romsey Amateur Operatic and Dramatic Society (RAODS), who stage between ten and fourteen productions each year and hire the venue out for other local productions, concerts, and functions.

=== Memorial Park ===
The town's memorial park, which plays host to the annual Mayor's Picnic, contains a Japanese Type 96 15 cm howitzer, one of two captured by the British and brought back to Romsey by Louis Mountbatten. One was donated to the town and the other retained on the grounds of his country estate, Broadlands.

=== Romsey signal box ===
Built in 1865, the signal box controlled the freight and passenger trains running on the railway lines passing through Romsey until 1982. Rescued from demolition by Romsey and District Buildings Preservation Trust, it is now a working museum.

=== Other places of interest ===
- Sir Harold Hillier Gardens – Gardens and arboretum
- Mottisfont Abbey – National Trust property with nationally renowned rose collection
- Paultons Park – Children's theme park

== Events ==
War Memorial Park

The Mayor's Picnic takes place in early-mid summer and is held in Romsey's Memorial Park. There is music performed by local schools, a variety of stalls, and the popular Duck Race, in which numbered plastic ducks 'race' each other along the river Test, to be scrupulously retrieved before awarding a prize to whoever chose the winning duck.

The Beggars Fair is held in the streets and pubs of Romsey on the second Saturday in July. It is a free festival featuring all types of music, together with dance and other street entertainment.

Romsey Carnival takes place during a week in July with the highlight being the procession through the streets of Romsey on the final Sunday afternoon.

The Romsey Agricultural & Horse Show is a large agricultural show that takes place on the second Saturday of September every year at Broadlands. The show is one of the oldest in England, held annually since 1842. In addition, Broadlands has twice hosted the CLA Game Fair, the largest countryside show in the world, most recently in July 2006.

The Winter Carnival takes places each year when Romsey's Christmas lights are switched on.

The Romsey Arts Festival occurs every 3 years, showcasing talent from in and around the local area.

Romsey Beer Festival is organised by the local Round Table, and takes place in October or November each year, at Crosfield Hall.

Romsey has two Rotary Clubs which are active, working with local business partners and schools to raise charitable funds for the community. The Rotary Clubs organise the annual Walk The Test Way which has become popular with several hundred walkers raising money for charities.

== Notable people ==
- Reverend W. Awdry – clergyman, railway enthusiast and author of The Railway Series from which the character Thomas the Tank Engine originated
- Edward Lyon Berthon – inventor and clergyman
- Charles Butler – author of children's books
- Martin Butler – composer
- Laura Carmichael – actress in Downton Abbey
- Andy Cook – footballer
- Harry Dennis – footballer
- Charlie Dimmock – TV gardening expert and presenter
- David Gower – retired cricketer and television personality
- Anthony Hayward – journalist and author
- Giles Jacob – legal writer and lexicographer
- John Latham – ornithologist and author
- Ollie Locke – featured in Made in Chelsea and Celebrity Big Brother 2014
- Ben Mansfield – actor
- Louis Mountbatten, 1st Earl Mountbatten of Burma lived at Broadlands
- Florence Nightingale – founder of modern nursing
- Lord Palmerston – statesman and Prime Minister
- William Petty – economist, philosopher and co-founder of the Royal Society
- James Robertson-Justice - actor
- John Russell Reynolds – neurologist and physician to Queen Victoria
- Richard Sharp – banker and Member of Parliament
- Tim Sills – footballer
- Nigel Spackman – footballer
- Kerrie Taylor – actress

== Education ==
=== Former schools ===
In around 1850, Osborne House School, located in Church Street, was established by John Frederick Osborne, who was a councillor as well as headmaster. In 1877, he was mayor of Romsey. It closed for a few years after his death, reopening in 1904 under the same name, owned by William Summers, who was the headmaster. It was a boarding school and offered "Special attention... to backward pupils and to those requiring preparation for business or professional life", including preparation for entrance to London University (Summers' alma mater), Oxford, and Cambridge", as well as other examinations. Summers died during World War II, and it started to be used by the council as an overflow for council schools and as a centre for school dinners at some point. It was demolished in the 1960s and new buildings erected on the site. Osborne House School stood on the site of present-day Abbey Walk. During the 1920s, secondary school boys continued to wear shorts.

Gilbert Percy Whitley, later an ichthyologist and curator of fishes at the Australian Museum in Sydney for about 40 years, attended Osborne House School.

=== Present-day ===
Present-day schools include:

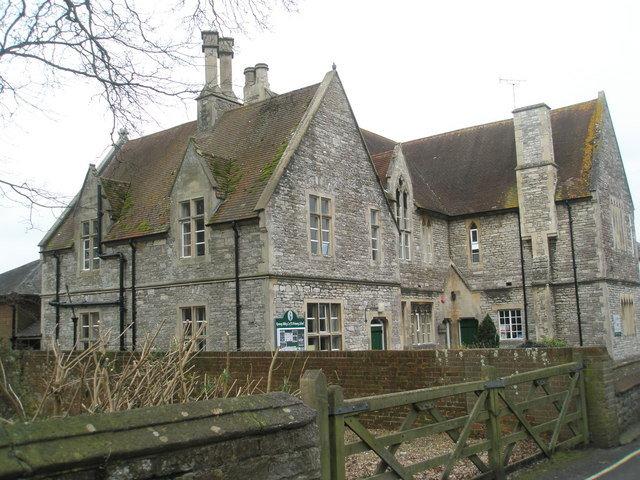
Romsey Abbey Primary School

State primary:

- Braishfield School
- Cupernham Infant School
- Cupernham Junior School
- Halterworth Primary School
- Romsey Primary School
- Romsey Abbey C of E Primary School

Independent primary:

- Stroud School
- Embley

State secondary:

- The Mountbatten School
- The Romsey School

Independent secondary:

- Embley

== Transport ==
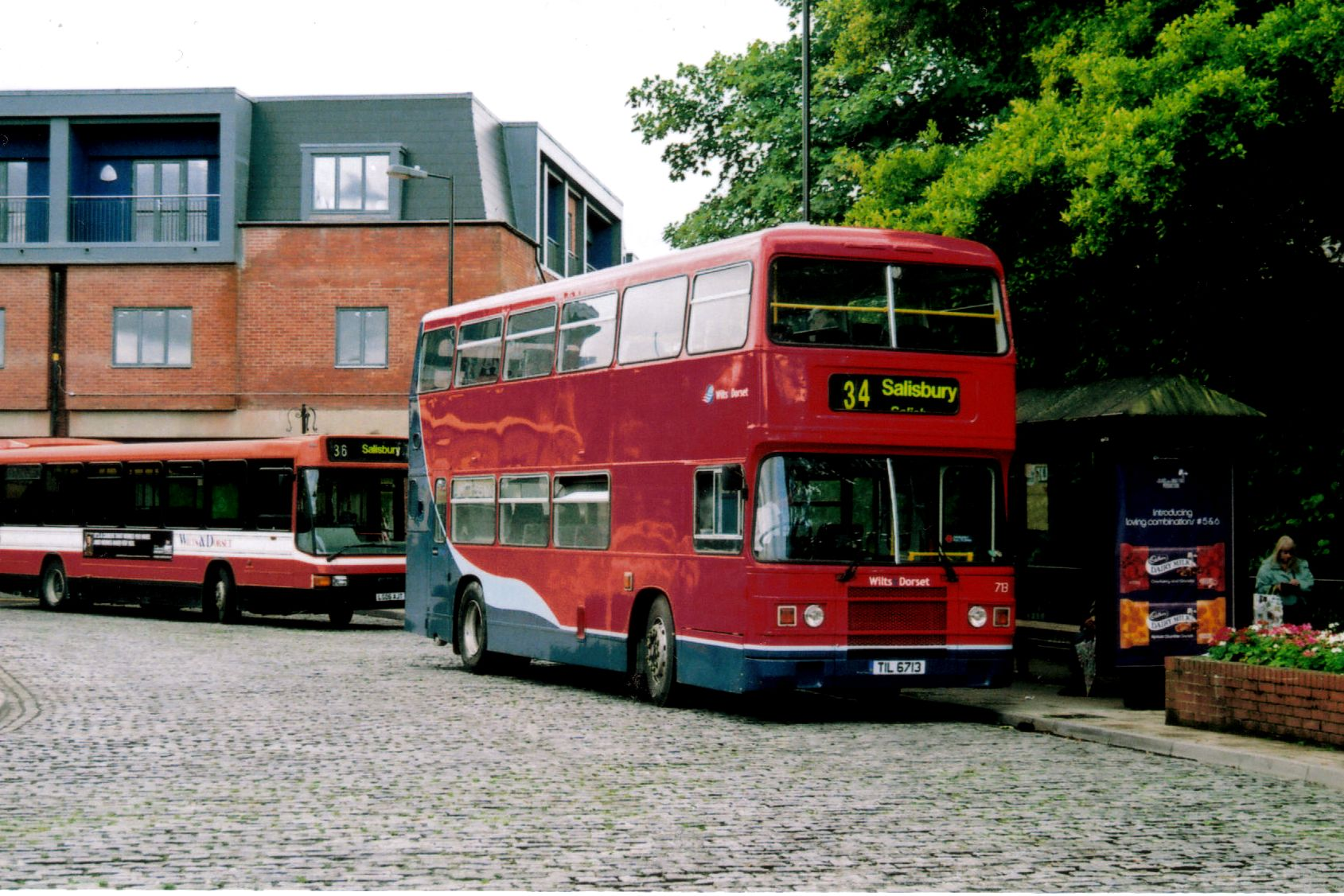
Two Wilts & Dorset buses at Romsey

Romsey is within 10 miles (16 km) of both the M27 and M3 motorways, providing fast links along the south coast and to London, and to the Midlands and the North via the A34. The A36 runs a few miles west of the town, providing a direct but not particularly quick route to the West of England and South Wales. There are cycle links to Southampton and Salisbury via route 24 of the National Cycle Network.

Romsey has a railway station, managed by South Western Railway, which provides services between Salisbury and Romsey, via Southampton and Eastleigh. The station is also served by services on Great Western Railway, operating services between Cardiff and Portsmouth, via Salisbury, Bath, Bristol, Southampton and Fareham.

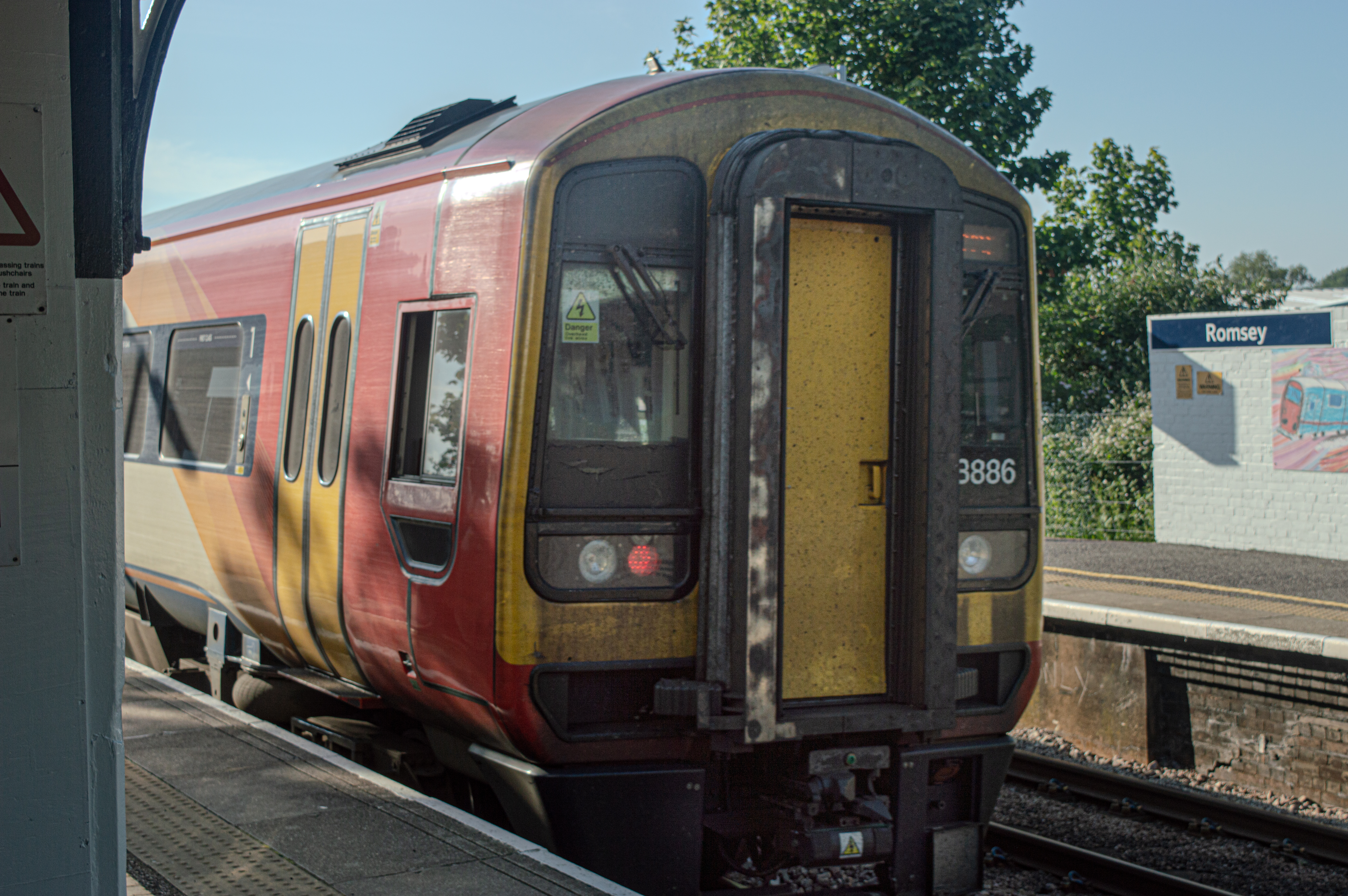
A South Western Railway Class 158 departing Romsey station for Salisbury

A dedicated shuttle bus linking Romsey with fast London trains at Winchester was discontinued in 2009 despite a campaign to save the service.

Current bus services are provided by Bluestar within the town, as well as to Southampton and Eastleigh, Salisbury Reds to Salisbury and Southampton, as well as Stagecoach to Winchester.

== Sport and leisure ==
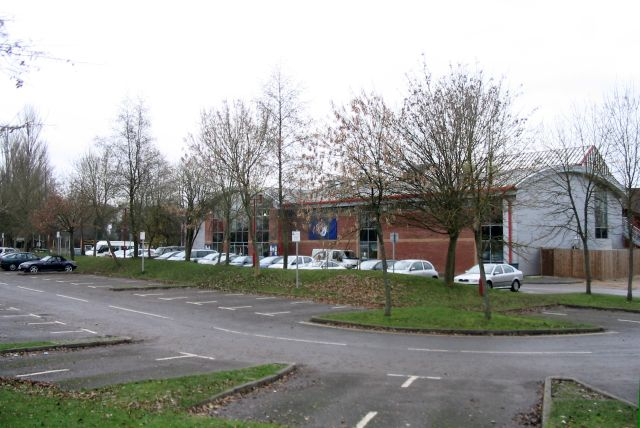
Romsey Rapids swimming pool

One of the cricket clubs is Old Tauntonians and Romsey Cricket Club.

The Wessex League football club Romsey Town FC play at The Bypass Ground, South Front.

Romsey Rugby Football Club is based at Ganger Farm. It fields teams of all ages each weekend of the playing season.

The town has a swimming pool, the Romsey Rapids.

== Media ==
Published every Friday, The Romsey Advertiser is the town's newspaper printed at Redbridge, Southampton.

== Media appearances ==
In Thomas Hardy's Wessex, the town of Deansleigh is based on Romsey; and Deansleigh Park, the residence of Lady Mottisfont in A Group of Noble Dames, is thought to be based on Broadlands.

In the 1980 and 1990s, Romsey was used as the location of fictional Sussex town Kingsmarkham in the television series The Ruth Rendell Mysteries. Romsey locations appear throughout the series concerning Inspector Wexford played by George Baker. The location used for the fictional police station was the former Romsey Magistrates' Court in Church Street.

A fictional "underground car park in Romsey" is referred to in an episode of the TV series Absolutely Fabulous.

== Freedom of the Borough ==
The following people and military units have received the Freedom of the Borough of Romsey.

=== Individuals ===
- Admiral of the Fleet Louis Mountbatten, 1st Earl Mountbatten of Burma: 1946.

=== Military units ===
- The Royal Hampshire Regiment: 26 September 1959.
- The Princess of Wales's Royal Regiment inherited the Freedom from the Royal Hampshire Regiment as a result of the 1992 Options for Change merger with the Queen's Regiment.
