= PS Orion =

Several paddle steamers have been named PS Orion including:

- SS Orion (1847), British vessel launched in 1847 and sank off Scotland in 1850.
- SS Orion (1865), American vessel launched in 1865 and lost on Lake Michigan in 1870.
