= Bradbeers =

British chain of department and furniture stores

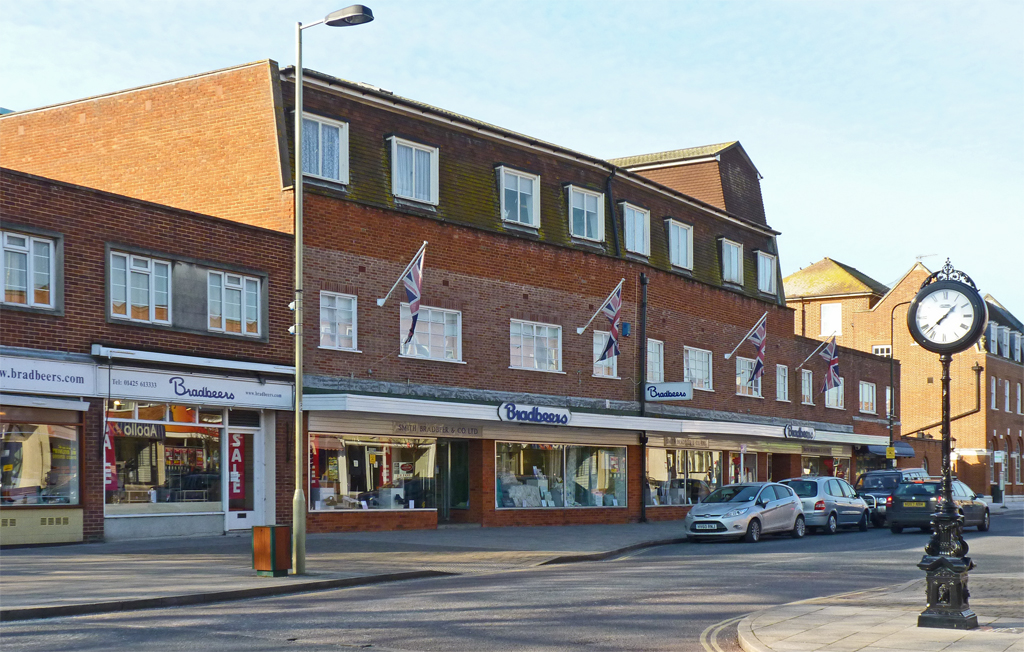
Bradbeers in New Milton

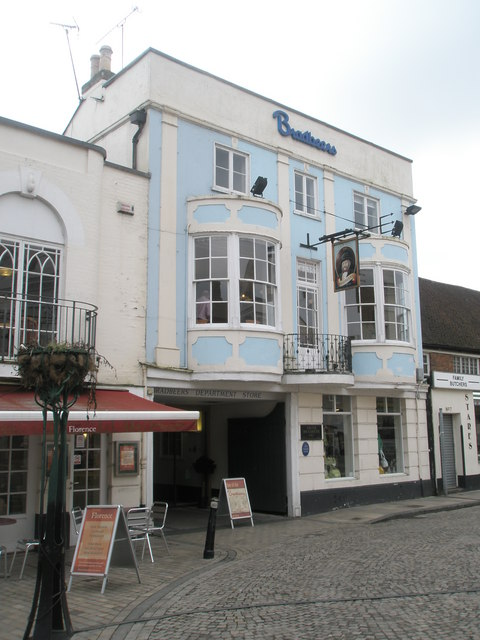
Bradbeers in Romsey

Smith Bradbeer & Company Limited, trading as Bradbeers, is a family run chain of department and furniture stores with branches in Salisbury, New Milton, Hedge End and Romsey. It has been running in Hampshire for over 175 years. The origins of the business stem back to a small drapery shop in Southampton run by R. S. Smith. The store traded under various names until 1892 when Mr Bradbeer entered the business. The shop was destroyed during the bombing of Southampton during World War II, and the firm ceased trading in the city. Today, the business operates from four main sites with department stores in Romsey and New Milton and furniture stores in both New Milton and Hedge End.

== History ==
=== Beginnings and name changes ===
In 1837 a small drapery shop in Bernard Street, Southampton was opened by Mr R. S. Smith. He was actively involved in the running of the business for another 50 years until his death in 1887. During that time, the firm's name changed to include the partners with whom he ran the business. In 1865 the business had changed its name to Smith, Bumpstead & Trippe, in 1884 it had changed to Smith, Brookman & Lewis, but following Mr Smith's death, Mr Lewis took over as manager, trading as Smith & Lewis until he retired in 1892. It was at this point that Mr Bradbeer entered the business and the firm became incorporated. It is perhaps worthy of note that Mr Smith never met Mr Bradbeer.

=== Southampton store ===
In 1905 the company relocated to a prime site in Above Bar, Southampton. In 1935, the store was expanded by taking over the next door site. Mr Bradbeer remained a bachelor all his life, and when he died in 1932 he left the business to his employees. Two members of staff in particular benefited from this. The first was a Mr Saunders who had joined the firm back in 1895 and who was Mr Bradbeer's right-hand man. The second was a Mr Gwilym Davies who had joined the firm in 1931 and who later married one of Mr Saunders' daughters. Gwilym Davies was the father of the present generation of owners of the business.

=== World War II ===
The company experienced a major setback during the Blitz when the Southampton store received a direct hit by a bomb on 23 November 1940. Two weeks later, however, the firm was trading again from sites in Shirley and New Milton. Plans were laid to rebuild the Southampton store after the war, but these were curtailed in 1949 when the local Council served a compulsory acquisition order. The following year's appeal was lost and so Smith Bradbeers left the city where it had been trading for over 100 years.

=== Postwar expansion ===
After the war, the company was trading from three towns; New Milton, Romsey and Eastleigh. 1969 saw the death of Gwilym Davies and the succession of his three sons to the helm of the business. The firm has continued to expand in the last 50 years.

== Bradbeers today ==
Bradbeers operates from four main sites, in three towns on the south coast. The department stores can be found in New Milton and Romsey whilst the furniture showrooms are based in New Milton and Hedge End. In addition, Bradbeers operates a Removals & Storage business out of Romsey as well as a furniture rental business. In addition a clearance furniture store is located on Eastleigh high street.

=== New Milton stores ===
The New Milton shop expanded vertically by building a new storey in 1969. It is currently located at 126–134 Station Road, New Milton, Hampshire. It has a cookware department, ladies' shoes department, menswear department, haberdashery and gifts department, perfumery department, ladies' fashions department, lingerie department, soft furnishings department, linens department and a restaurant.

A furniture store established by Bradbeers is also located in New Milton.

=== Romsey store ===
The Romsey branch, situated at 14–20 Bell Street, Romsey, Hampshire, was opened in a building formerly known as the Dolphin Inn and expanded by buying up adjoining properties in the 1960s and 1970s. A Major expansion which doubled the floor area and included the installation of an escalator and provision of two new restaurants was complete in 2003. The building is reportedly haunted by the ghost of a white or blue lady who has been sighted in the older parts of the store. This branch sells a range of products including clothing, cosmetics, jewellery, homeware and luggage.

=== Hedge End store ===
The most recent major expansion of the business was in 2010 with the acquisition of a retail park in the thriving retail arena of Hedge End, the largest of the site was redeveloped and is now operated by Bradbeers as a furniture showroom. The remaining four sites are let to other businesses.

=== Salisbury (former Debenhams) ===
In October 2023, a branch of Bradbeers opened in the former Debenhams building in Salisbury.

== Charitable Trust ==
The Smith Bradbeer Charitable Trust was set up in 1997 and is a registered charity. The key objectives are to support the advancement of the Christian Faith (anywhere in the world). It is a grant making charity to support churches, missionaries and evangelism anywhere in the world.

The Trust is dependent on Smith Bradbeer & Co for donations received, and is administered by a management committee comprising five trustees.

The Trust donates a percentage of profits annually for the advancement of its objectives.

== Markets ==
Smith Bradbeer & Co manages the popular Romsey market held in the Cornmarket outside the Romsey department store, taking place on Tuesday, Friday and Saturday every week.
