= Sadler's Mill =

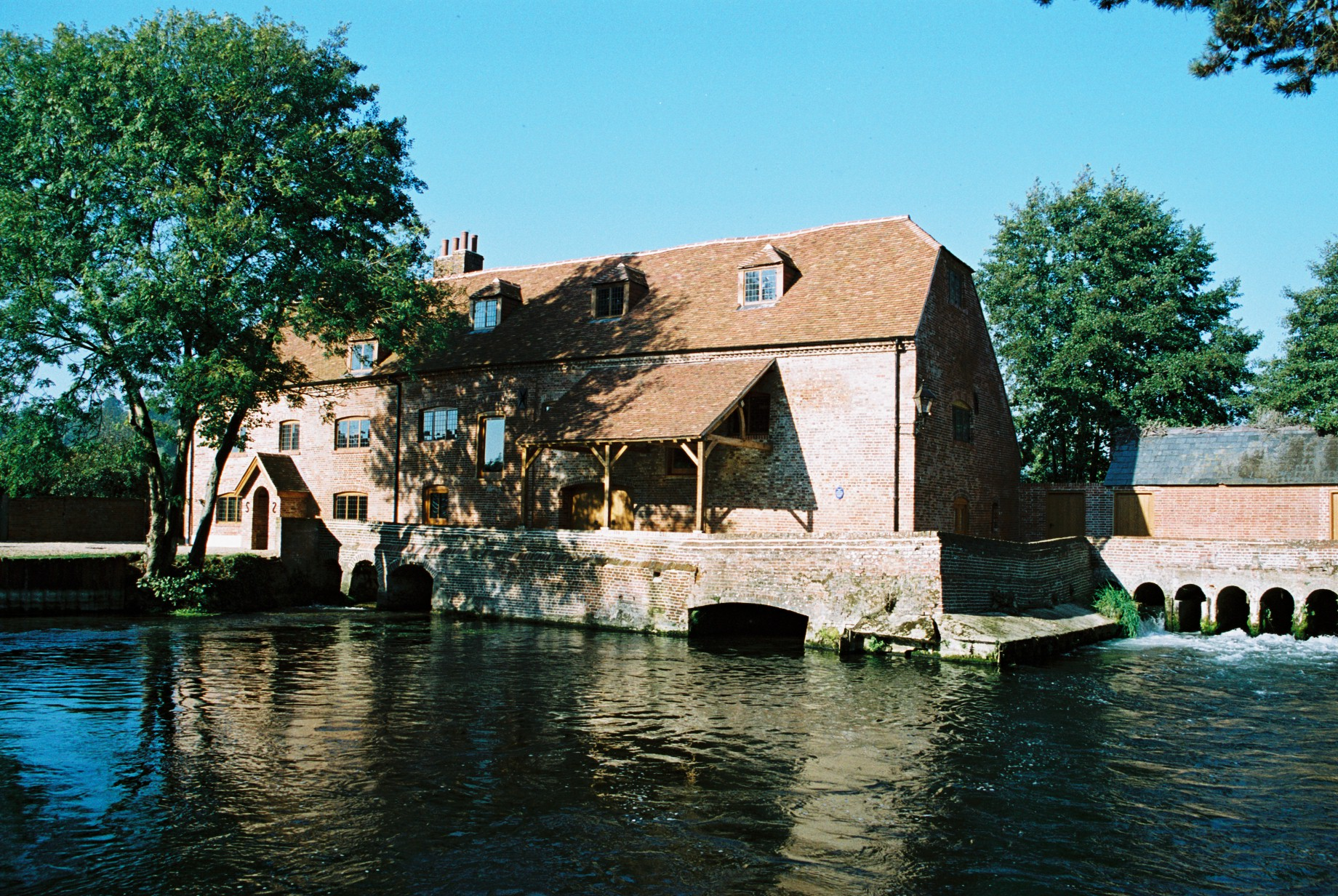

- Location within Hampshire
- 50°59′11″N 1°30′24″W
- Type: Watermill
- Location: 1 The Causeway, Romsey
- OS grid reference: SU 34723 20877

History
- Built: 1748

Site notes
- Area: Hampshire
- Owner: Private

Listed Building – Grade II
- Official name: Sadler's Mill
- Designated: 28 August 1951
- Reference no.: 1231606

Sadler's Mill, also referred to as Saddlers Mill, is a watermill in Romsey, Hampshire, England. It is probably the best known of Romsey's surviving mills and is apparently the only mill to be developed on the main course of the River Test. The existence of Sadler's Mill is first recorded in the 16th century, when it was owned by the manor of Great and Little Spursholt. Functioning as a corn and grist mill, it has passed through a succession of owners including Lord Palmerston who rebuilt it in 1747 and sold it in 1777 to one Benjamin Dawkins. Following another succession of owners it returned to the Broadlands estate in 1889. Milling ceased in 1932, when the mill building became redundant. The Broadlands estate sold the building in 2003, at which point it was close to collapse having been derelict for many years. Anthony and Sarah de Sigley, restored the building in 2005, rebuilding much of the original structure. During the restoration evidence of an earlier structure was found; carbon-14 dating established the age of this to be c. 1650. The restoration was completed by Dave Northway and Amanda Deeming, the new owners from 2008 onwards.

It is a Grade II listed building.

== Recorded history ==
- 1573 Sir Raphe Sadler
- 1718 Sparsholt Mill bought by William Horne and Andrew Martin
- 1745 Sold to Lord Palmerston
- 1748 New Corn Mill built “Spursholt New Mills” with one small grist mill. Mill House built
- 1777 Sold to Benjamin Dawkins
- 1813 Sold to James Fish with two water wheels
- 1846 sold to William Fripp
- 1846 sold to Aine Burt and becomes known as “Burt’s Mill”
- 1851 saw mill installed
- 1876 sold to William Jeffery
- 1889 sold to A Ashley and becomes part of the Broadlands estate again
- 1931 Milling Ceased. WE Holloway is the last miller.
- 1968 Turbine generation ceases
- 2003 Sold to Anthony and Sarah de Sigley
- 2005 Restoration and modernisation of the Mill House complete and sold to Garry and Vanessa Venturi
- 2007 The Wheel House sold to David and Sally Ellis
- 2008 Sadlers Mill - The Mill sold to Dave Northway and Amanda Deeming requiring restoration
- 2011 The Mill House sold to David and Aimee Anderson

== See also ==
- Romsey
- River Test
- List of watermills in the United Kingdom
