= PS Orion (1847) =

Scottish paddle steamer

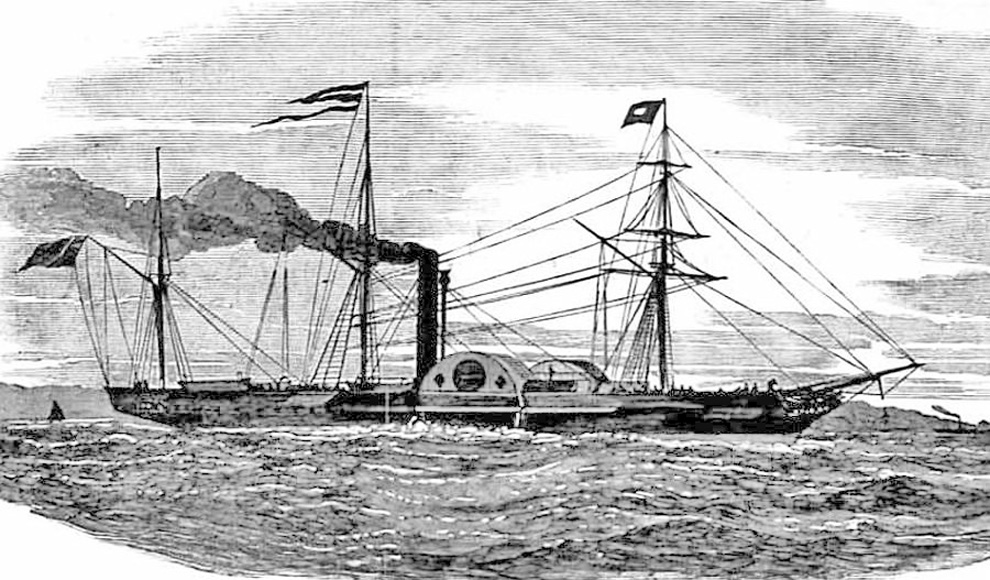

History
- Name: PS Orion
- Owner: G & J Burns
- Port of registry: Glasgow, Scotland
- Builder: Caird & Company
- Yard number: 14
- Launched: 19 December 1846
- Completed: 1847
- In service: 1847
- Out of service: 1850
- Fate: Wrecked

General characteristics
- Type: Paddle steamer
- Tonnage: 899 gross tons, 460 net tons
- Length: 210.6 feet
- Depth: 18.2 feet

PS Orion was a G & J Burns paddle steamer, built by Caird & Company in Scotland in 1847. The steamer sank off Portpatrick Lighthouse, Wigtownshire, Scotland in 1850, with the loss of 41 of the 200 passengers on board.

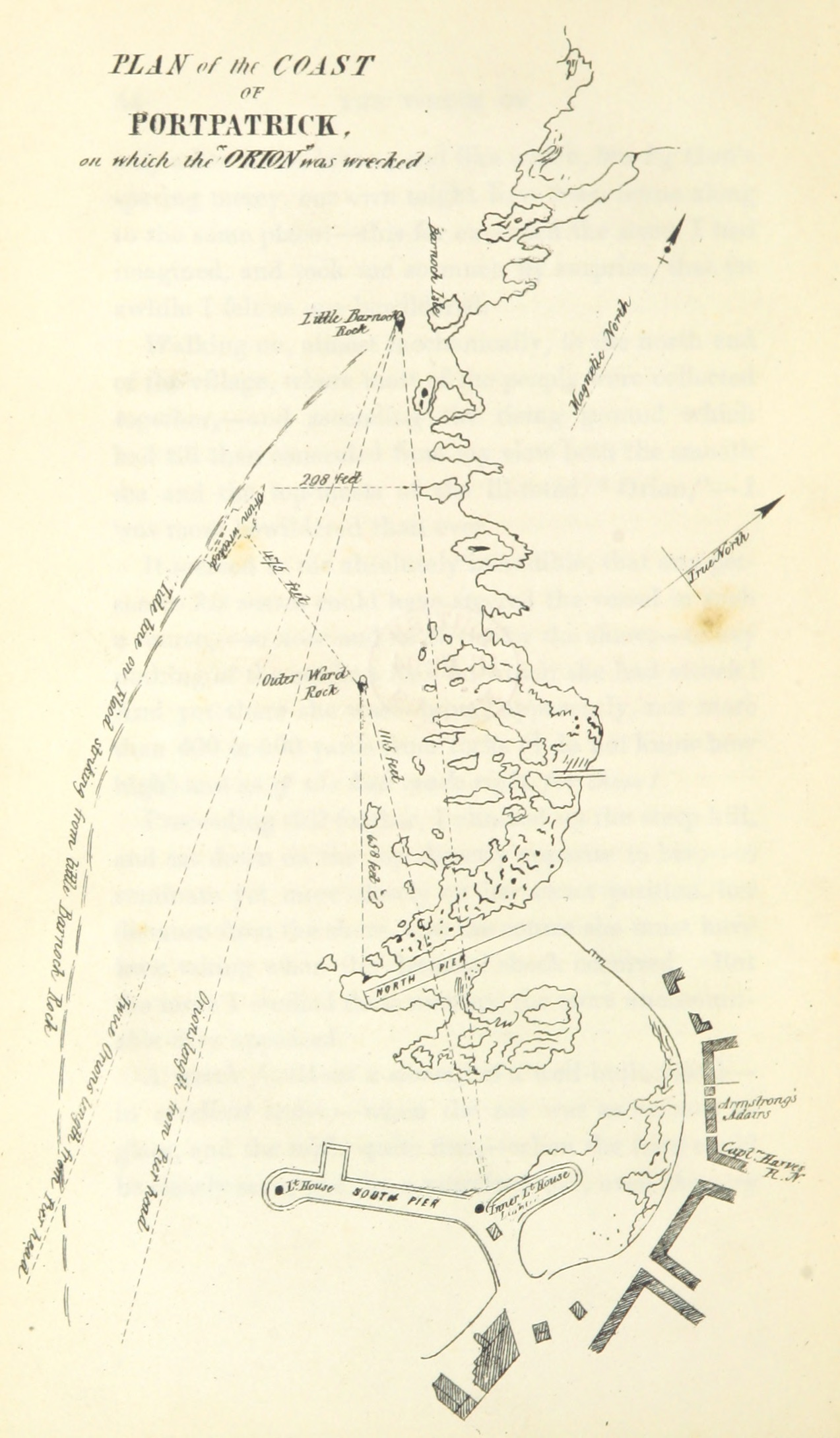
Map of the coastline where the wreck took place

== History ==
PS Orion was paddle steamer, built in 1847 for G & J Burns by Caird & Company at the Cartsdyke Yard in Greenock, Scotland. It was an iron ship, that was 210.6 feet long and had 3 masts. G & J Burns registered the paddle steamer under their subsidiary Glasgow & Liverpool Steam Shipping Co. in Glasgow, Scotland. The ship was launched on December 19, 1846.

Orion struck a submerged rock and sank off Portpatrick Lighthouse, Wigtownshire, Scotland, on 18 June 1850 on her way from Liverpool, England to Glasgow. Some of the passengers were rescued by the Isle of Man vessel Fenella, others by boats from Portpatrick. However, 41 of the 200 passengers died when the steamer sank.

The eminent surgeon John Burns was one of the passengers killed in the accident. Another passenger who died was John Burns, Regius Professor of Medicine at Glasgow University and brother of George and James Burns of G & J Burns. Among the survivors were John McNeill, who was later a major general in the British Army, and his brother Alexander McNeill, a future Independent Member of Parliament; however, their parents and two sisters died in the wreck.

The Orion's captain was found guilty of the "culpable bereavement of the lives of the passengers" and was imprisoned for eighteen months. The second mate was transported.

== Legacy ==
The incident was described in the 1851 book The Wreck of the Orion, a Tribute of Gratitude by Reverend Joseph Clarke, who was one of the survivors.

Reverend Edward Lyon Berthon was inspired to invent the collapsible Berthon Boat in the years after to allow ships like Orion to carry more lifeboats.
