= Romsey Town Hall =

Municipal building in Romsey, Hampshire, England

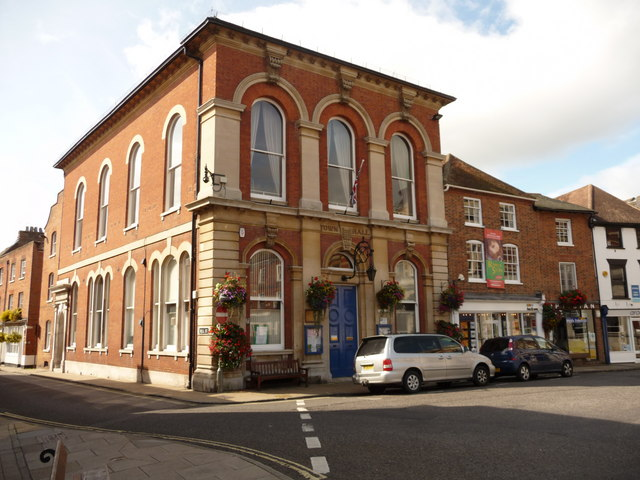
- Romsey Town Hall

- Shown in Hampshire
- 50.9888°N 1.4999°W
- Location: Market Place, Romsey

History
- Built: 1866

Site notes
- Architect: Alfred Bedborough
- Architectural style: Italianate style

Romsey Town Hall is a municipal building in the Market Place in Romsey, Hampshire, England. The structure is the meeting place of Romsey Town Council.

== History ==
The first municipal building in the town was a medieval structure in the Market Place which was described latterly as "a small old house in bad repair". In the 17th century civic leaders decided to buy a house at The Hundred and to convert it for use as a town hall and as a lock-up for petty criminals. In 1736, the 1st Viscount Palmerston acquired Broadlands and thereby became lord of the manor: it was in this building that he preferred to conduct his court business. (Note: The former town hall survives as No. 23 The Hundred and is now occupied by an opticians' business.) The building was used for cultural events: an audience of nearly 100 people attended a concert there in 1772 and, during the Swing Riots, the mayor permitted several hundred labourers, as well as the farmers, to attend a meeting at the town hall in 1830.

The old building in the Market Place was demolished and replaced by a more substantial market hall known as the "Audit House" on Palmerston's instigation in 1744. This building was arcaded on the ground floor so that markets could be held, with an assembly hall on the first floor and a turret on the roof. Magistrates' court hearings and civic meetings were held in the assembly room. However, by 1820 the audit house had become dilapidated and had to be demolished. Instead a building to the west of Romsey Abbey was acquired and converted for use as the sole municipal building, replacing both the audit house in the Market Place and the town hall in The Hundred. (Note: In the early 20th century this building was still being used for lectures and concerts.)

The current building was commissioned by the then Prime Minister, the 3rd Viscount Palmerston, in September 1863. The foundation stone was laid by the mayor, Charles Dyett, on 26 September 1865. It was designed by Alfred Bedborough in the Italianate style, built in red brick with stone dressings by a Mr Dallimore of Fareham at a cost of £3,000 and was officially opened by the then mayor, Christopher Legg Lordan, on 24 July 1866. The design involved a symmetrical main frontage with three bays facing onto the Market Square; on the ground floor, there was a central round headed doorway with a fanlight which was flanked by two round headed sash windows separated by pilasters supporting a cornice. The keystone above the door was inscribed with a portcullis and the initials of the mayor at the time of the opening of the building. On the first floor there were three rounded headed sash windows which were also separated by pilasters supporting a cornice. Internally, the principal rooms were the courtroom and the council chamber, and there was also a small lock-up. A statue of the 3rd Viscount Palmerston by Matthew Noble was unveiled outside the town hall in 1868.

The town hall continued to serve as the headquarters of Romsey Borough Council for much of the 20th century but ceased to be the local seat of government when the enlarged Test Valley District Council was formed in 1974. It subsequently became the meeting place of Romsey Town Council.

Works of art in the town hall include a portrait by George Woolway of King Edward VII, as well as a portraits by Godfrey Kneller of the economist and scientist, Sir William Petty, and a portrait by Dwight Stark of Earl Mountbatten. Both Petty and Mountbatten were buried at Romsey Abbey.
