= Paul Émile Berton =

French painter

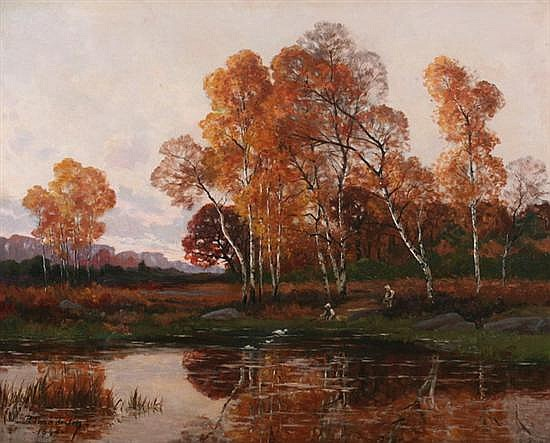
Stand of trees at river's edge

Paul Émile Berton (May 4, 1846 in Chartrettes, Seine-et-Marne – February 15, 1909 in Paris) was a French landscape painter.

He is sometimes confused with the French Art Nouveau painter, poster designer and lithographer Paul Berthon (March 15, 1872 in Villefranche-sur-Saône, death date and place unknown).

In the arts trade many lithographs by Paul Berthon are often attributed to Paul Émile Berton.
