= André Berthon =

French politician

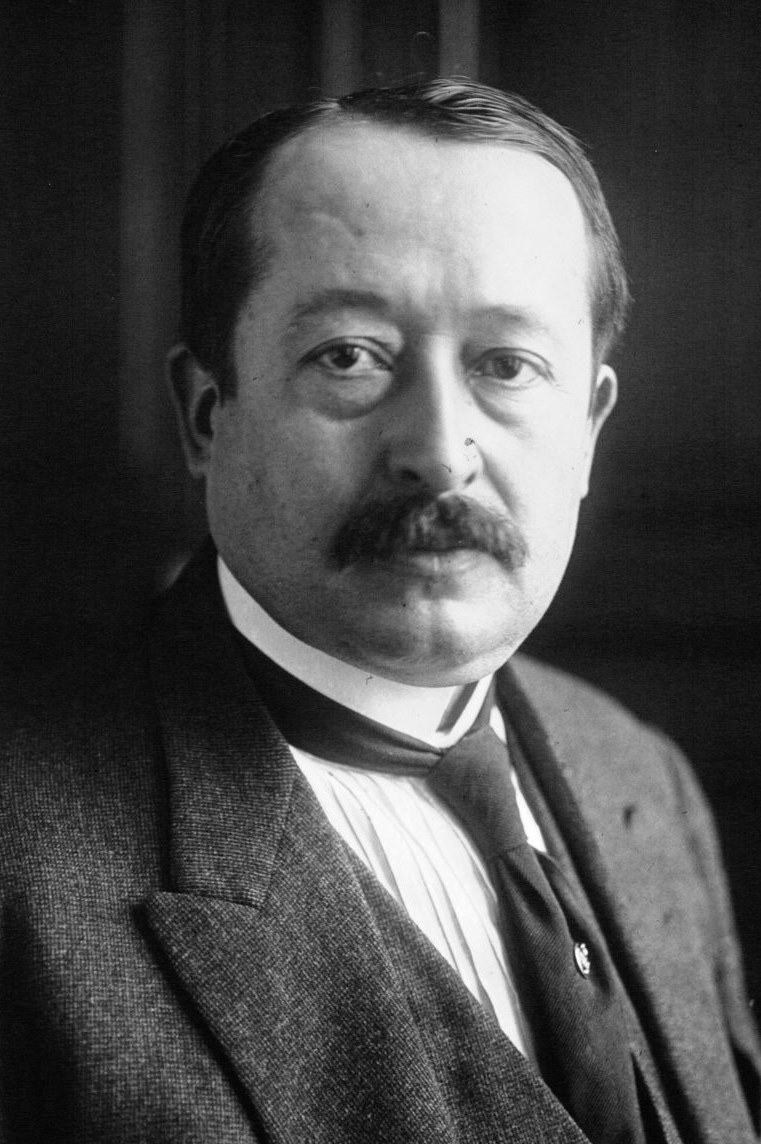
- Born: 21 July 1882; Petit-Palais, Gironde, France
- Died: 16 November 1968 (aged 86); Paris, France
- Occupation: Politician

André Berthon (1882–1968) was a French politician. He served as a member of the Chamber of Deputies from 1919 to 1932.
