= Sceaux =

Sceaux is the name or part of the name of several communes in France:

- Sceaux, Hauts-de-Seine, in the Hauts-de-Seine département, known for the Château de Sceaux
- Sceaux, Yonne, in the Yonne département
- Sceaux-d'Anjou, in the Maine-et-Loire département
- Sceaux-du-Gâtinais, in the Loiret département
- Sceaux-sur-Huisne, in the Sarthe département
