= Paul Berthon =

French artist (1872–1909)

- Born: Paul Louis Joseph Berthon; 15 March 1872; Villefranche-sur-Saône, France
- Died: 27 February 1934 (aged 61); Sceaux, France
- Education: Ecole Normale d'Enseignement de Dessin
- Known for: Lithography, poster art
- Movement: Art Nouveau

Paul Berthon (15 March 1872 – 27 February 1934) was a French artist, who primarily produced posters and lithographs.

== Early life and education ==
Paul Louis Joseph Berthon was born in 1872 in Villefranche-sur-Saône in France, where he studied painting before moving to Paris. He later enrolled at the Ecole Normale d'Enseignement de Dessin. He followed lessons in painting from Luc-Olivier Merson, and in decorative arts from Eugène Grasset. The latter had a far greater influence on him, and he may be regarded as his pupil.

== Career ==
Berthon's work contains primarily coloured lithograph posters in Art Nouveau style, much like his contemporary Alphonse Mucha. His decorative arts studies influenced his printmaking, resulting in his characteristic use of strong lines and natural details that guided his art. The vast majority of Berthon's chromolithographed posters did not include advertisements and were meant to stand on their own. His work is included in the poster series Les Maîtres de l'Affiche, for which he also created the cover art.

In 1903 Berthon decided to abandon his career as an artist and move to a career in the courts of justice. On 9 april 1903 he was appointed justice of the peace (juge de paix) in Jussey. He remained juge de paix the rest of his life. On 9 august 1927, while serving in the 10th arrondissement is Paris, he was awarded the Légion d'Honneur in the class of Chevalier.

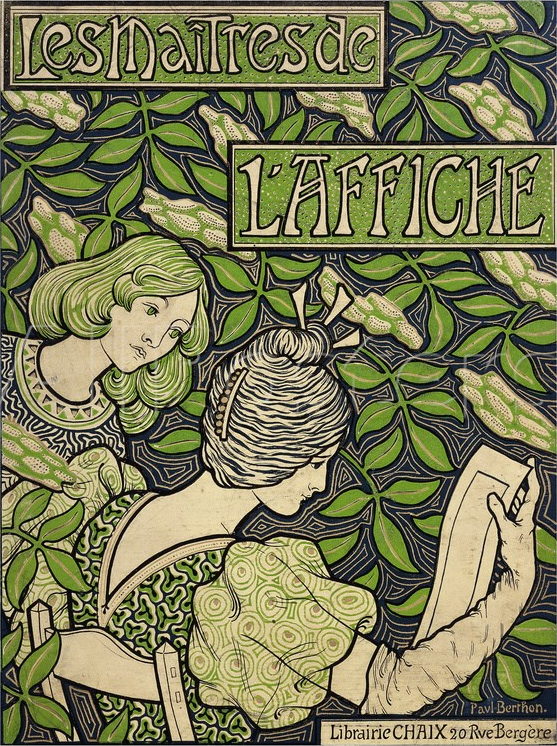
Cover of Les Maîtres de l'Affiche (1895)

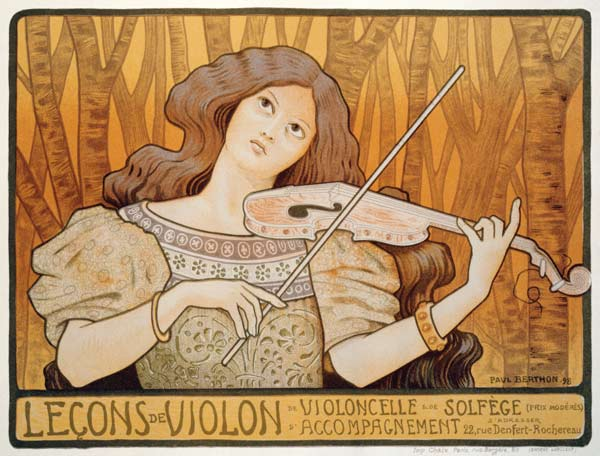
Leçons de violon (1895)

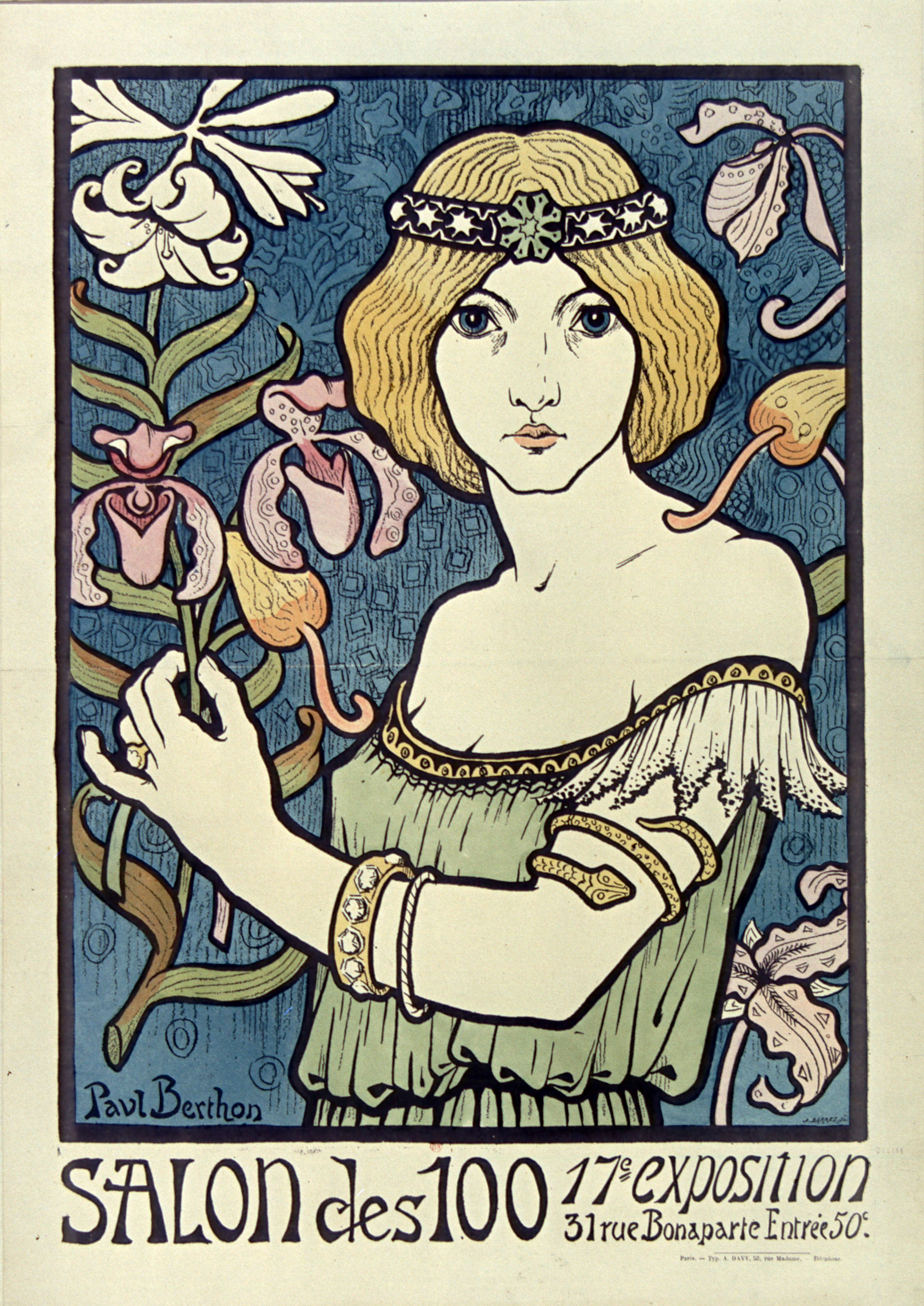
Salon des Cent (1895)

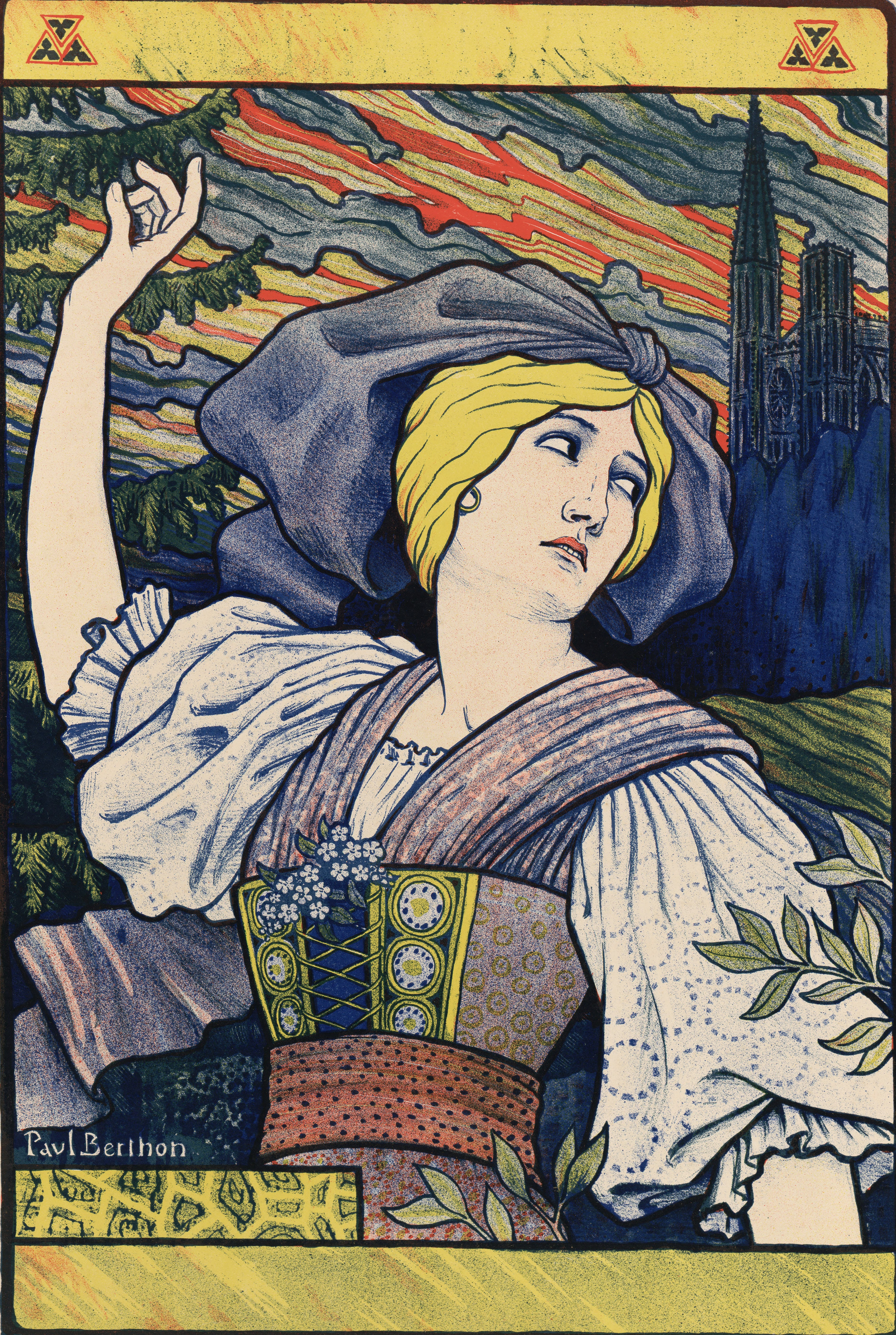
Almanach d'Alsace et de Lorraine (1896)

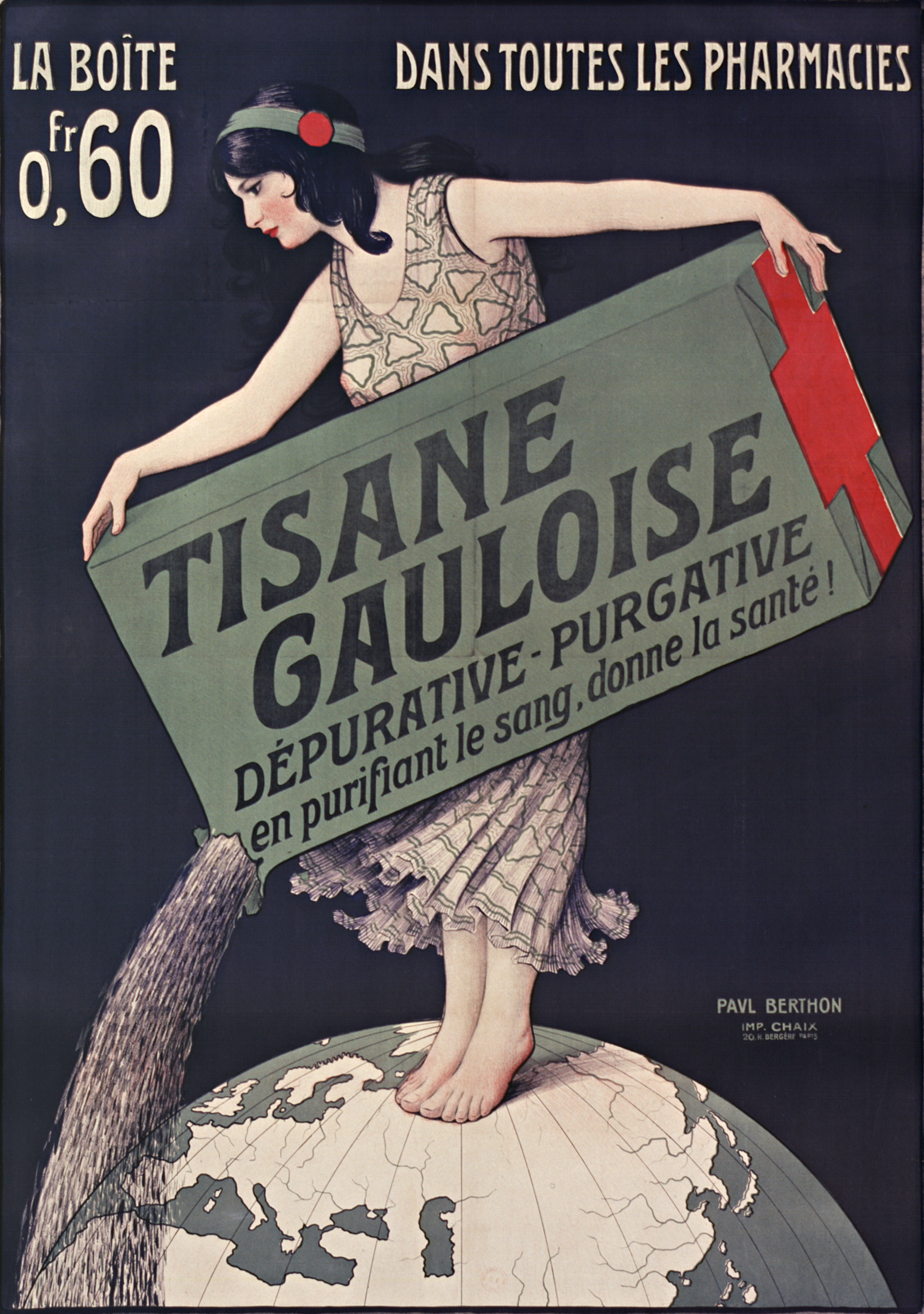
Tisane Gauloise (1896)

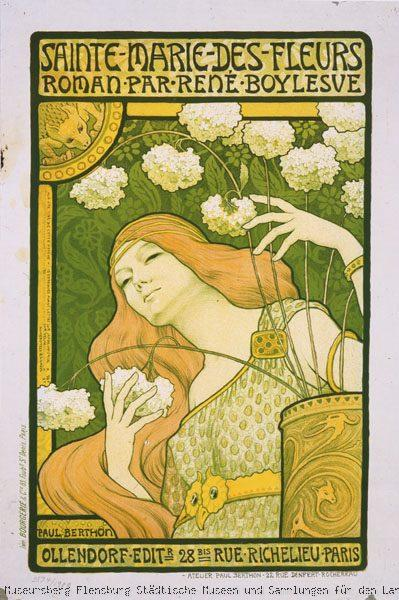
Sainte-Marie-des-Fleurs (1897)

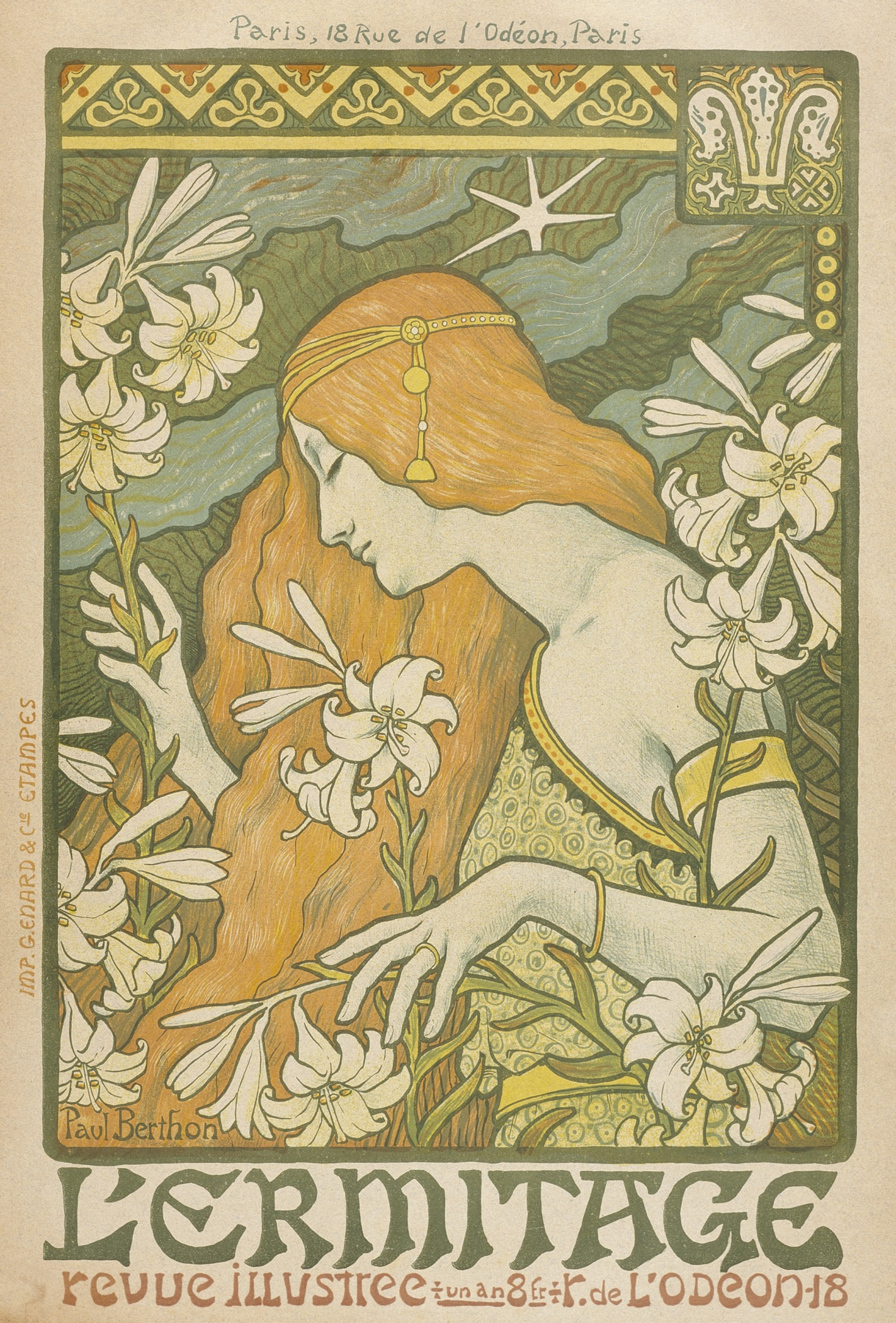
Revue L'ermitage (1897)

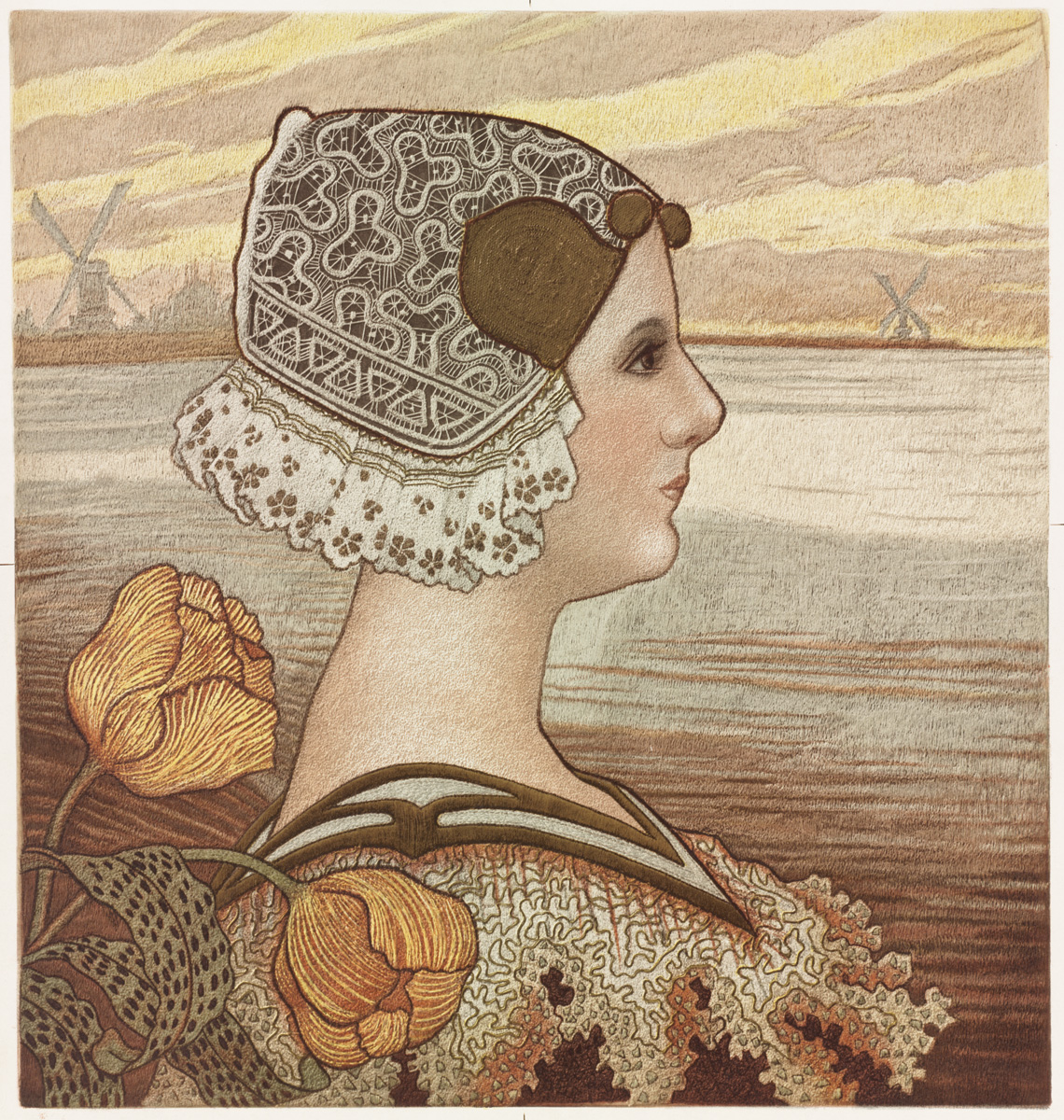
Queen Wilhelmina of the Netherlands (1898)

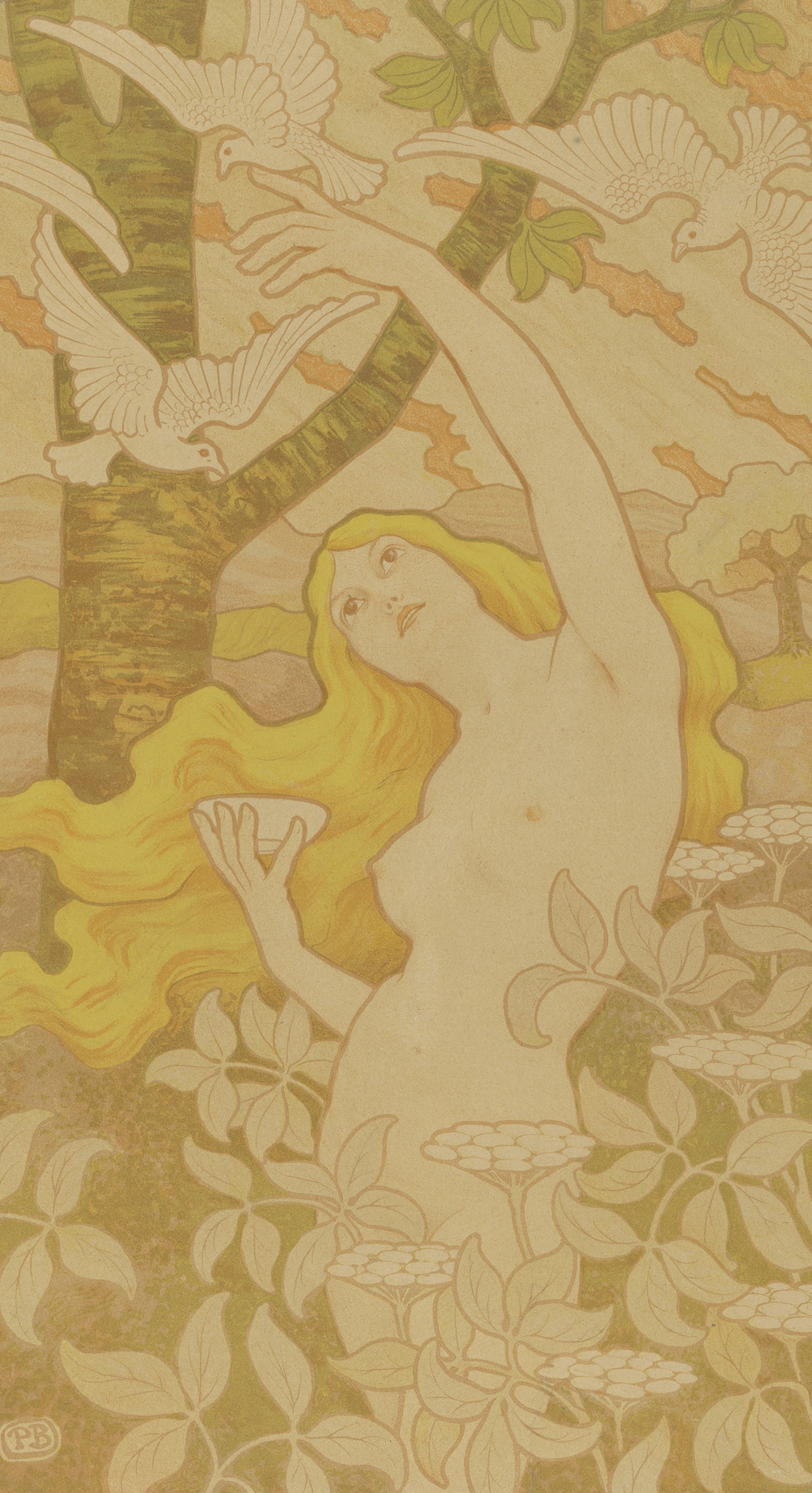
Poem art for "Le livre de Magda" by Armand Silvestre (1898)

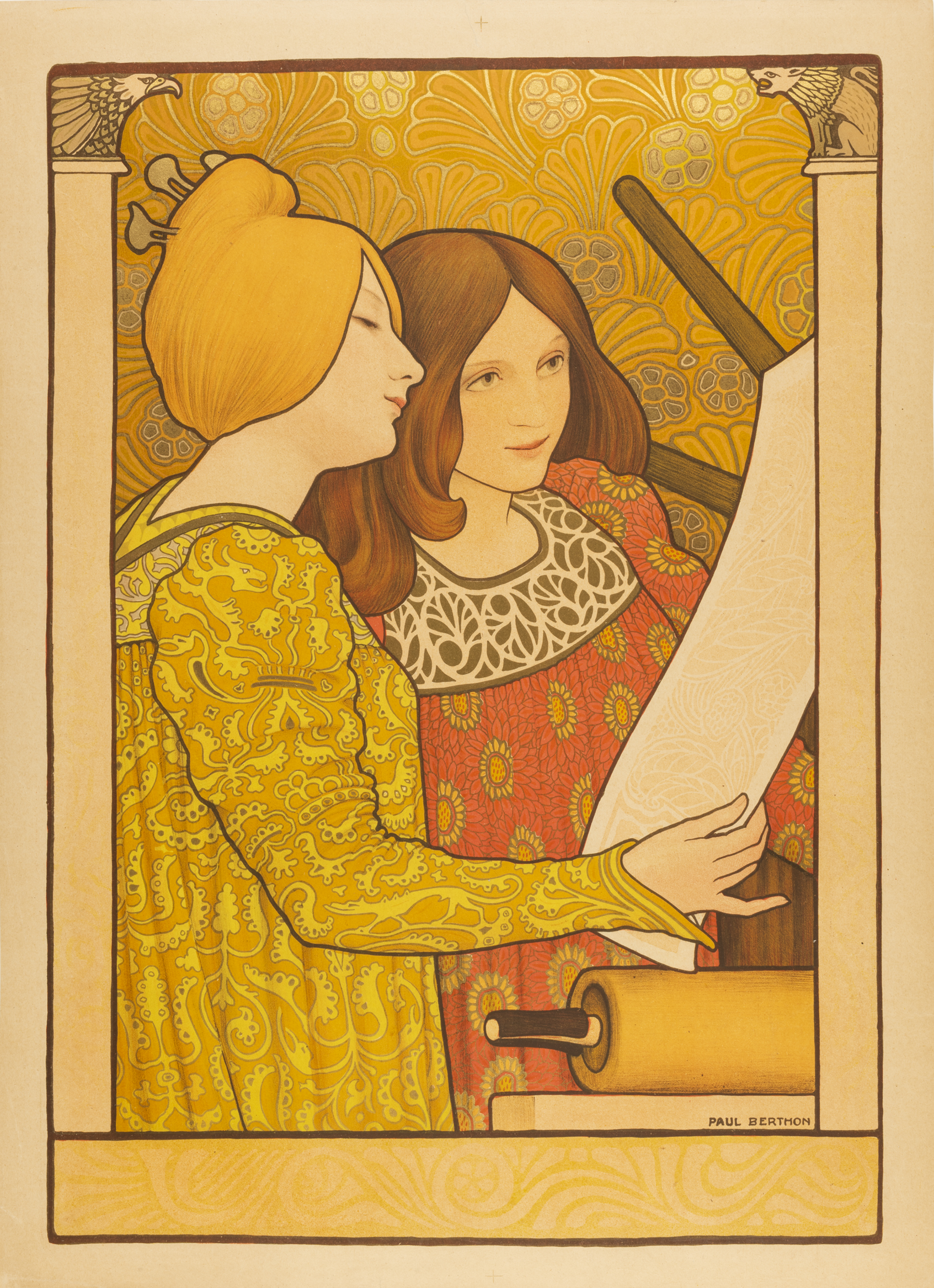
Two girls at the printing press for Salon des Arts Libéraux (1900)

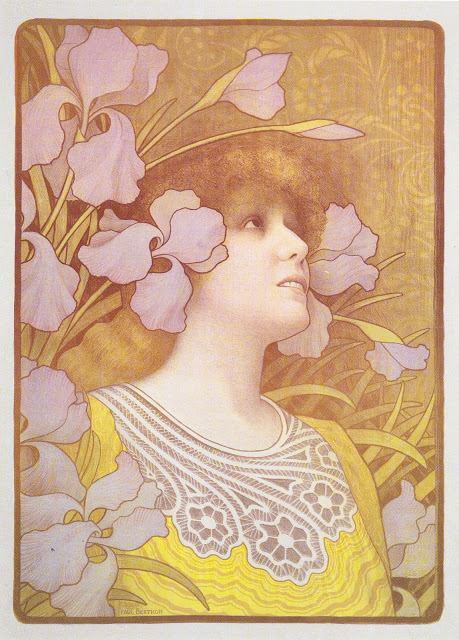
Sarah Bernhardt as Mélissinde in La Princesse Lointaine (1901)

== See also ==
- List of French artists
- List of illustrators
- List of poster artists
- Les Maîtres de l'Affiche
