= Berthon Boat =

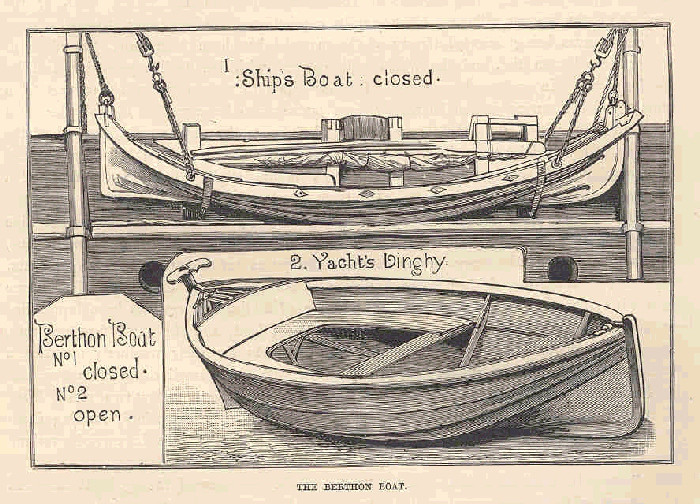
Berthon Boat

Berthon Boats are collapsible lifeboats used in the late 19th and early 20th centuries. They have double linings of canvas, sectioned into watertight envelopes that assist buoyancy and give protection from the possibility that the outer canvas could be accidentally torn. The canvas was also coated with "linseed oil, soft soap, and yellow ochre" to make it waterproof.

== History ==
When, on the 18 June 1850, the SS Orion was wrecked off Portpatrick, the Reverend Clark, a survivor, wrote to the Reverend Edward Lyon Berthon: “Can not you think of a way in which boats, enough for all on board, be stowed on a passenger steamer without inconvenience?”. This led to Berthon's development of the Berthon Collapsible Lifeboat.

When the boat was demonstrated to Queen Victoria, the Prince Consort, the Princess Royal and the Prince of Wales, the latter commented that a cannonball would go through it easily. Berthon asked him what a cannonball would not go through, and the Queen was reported to have been greatly amused.

The Prince Consort commended it to the Royal Navy, but the Admiralty complained there was nowhere to mount a gun. Nonetheless, the Royal Navy accepted a perfected design in 1873.

After the sinking of the Titanic in 1912, the White Star Line’s owner, J. Bruce Ismay, required that every passenger boat under his control would thereafter be fitted with sufficient lifeboats for all passengers. In his speech at the close of the British Wreck Commissioner’s inquiry into the sinking of the RMS Titanic, the Attorney General called for more life saving devices at sea, including lifeboats, and regulations that would ‘apply to the vessels of all countries’ to enforce this request.

== Reverend Edward Lyon Berthon ==
In addition to ministering to his parish, the Reverend Edward Lyon Berthon of Romsey, Hampshire, ran a boat building and engineering enterprise. In 1877, he started a company in Romsey, building folding lifeboats and "other floating machines", which (originally designed as lifeboats) were the mainstay of his business.

The prototype was developed by him at HMS Excellent, Whale Island, Portsmouth, where he was chaplain. A seaman was drowned in an early trial in 1854 after the boat was overloaded with a 13-inch mortar.

Berthon was related to the mid-twentieth century engineer, Peter Berthon, who developed the ERA racing car in the 1930s and the BRM post-war.

The Berthon Boat Company is still operating today on the same site in Lymington that it moved to in 1918 and is still a boat yard with a workforce of 100 skilled craftsmen specialising in the refit and repair of yachts of up to 150 feet. It also has a 280 berth deep water marina and a yacht sales division.
