= Edward Berthon =

19th-century English inventor and clergyman

Edward Lyon Berthon FRAS (20 February 1813 London – 27 October 1899) was an English inventor and clergyman.

== Life ==
He was born in Finsbury Square, London, on 20 February 1813, was the tenth child of Peter Berthon, and his wife, Elizabeth Green Park, daughter of Henry Park of Liverpool, who were married in 1797. His father was great-grandson of St. Pol le Berthon, the only son of the Huguenot Marquis de Chatellerault, who escaped the persecutions that followed the revocation of the edict of Nantes in 1685. He found a refuge in Lisbon, whence his son proceeded to London. Peter Berthon was an army contractor, who was reduced from wealth to comparative poverty by the wreck of a number of his ships and the end of the war on the downfall of Napoleon.

Berthon was at school in Wanstead and then at the Monoux School Walthamstow (of which he left a memoir). From there, he studied medicine in Liverpool and Dublin, but after his marriage in 1834 he gave up his intention of becoming a doctor, and travelled for about six years on the continent. Keenly interested from boyhood in mechanical science, he made experiments in the application of the screw propeller for boats. But his model, with a two-bladed propeller, was only ridiculed when it was placed before the British admiralty. Berthon therefore did not complete the patent and the idea was left for Francis Smith to bring out more successfully in 1838.

In 1841 he entered Magdalene College, Cambridge, in order to study for the Church. There he produced what is usually known as "Berthon's log", in which the suction produced by the water streaming past the end of a pipe projected below a ship is registered on a mercury column above.

In 1845, he was ordained, and after holding a curacy at Lymington was given a living at Fareham. Here he was able to carry on experiments with his log, which was tested on the Southampton to Jersey steamboats; but the British admiralty gave him no encouragement, and it remained uncompleted. He then designed some instruments to indicate the trim and rolling of boats at sea; but the idea for which he is chiefly remembered was that of the "Berthon Folding Boat" in 1849. This invention was again adversely reported on by the Admiralty. Berthon resigned his living at Fareham, and subsequently accepted the living of Romsey.

In 1856, Berthon unsuccessfully trialled an India-rubber mortar raft off Southsea Castle, which split open and sank with the loss of one man drowned after firing the fifteenth round. A scathing editorial in The Engineer issue of Friday January 18, 1856, read:

"The Reverend Mr. Berthon offers himself as another example of the consequences of a man mistaking his vocation. This gentleman resigns his incumbency that he may be the better enabled to turn all his attention to, and occupy all his time in, the construction of a mortar-raft, which failed altogether to withstand the concussion consequent upon the discharge of the ordnance it was intended to sustain. It parts asunder, and disappears. Fortunately for the inventor, he had kept at a distance (not from fear, but for the purpose of witnessing the practice), and so escaped without hurt. One poor fellow was, however, not so fortunate. We trust Mr. Berthon will think no more of mortar-rafts. It ill becomes the minister of peace to renounce his mission, and devote the talent he possesses to the fabrication of war implements and the construction of war craft. War is, at best, in its strictest necessity, an appalling alternative; and from the preparation of its death-dealing machinery it seems peculiarly advisable and proper that the clergyman should keep his hands aloof."

In 1873, encouraged by Samuel Plimsoll, he again applied himself to perfecting his collapsible boat. Success was at last achieved, and in less than a year he had received orders from the admiralty for boats to the amount of £15,000. Some were taken by Sir George Nares to the Arctic, others were sent to General Gordon at Khartoum, and others again were taken to the Zambezi by Frederick Selous. Alain Gerbault used one as his tender in his famous 1923-1929 solo circumnavigation aboard his 39-foot sailboat Firecrest.

He died at the vicarage, Romsey, on 27 October 1899.
