= Edgar Degas =

French Impressionist artist (1834–1917)

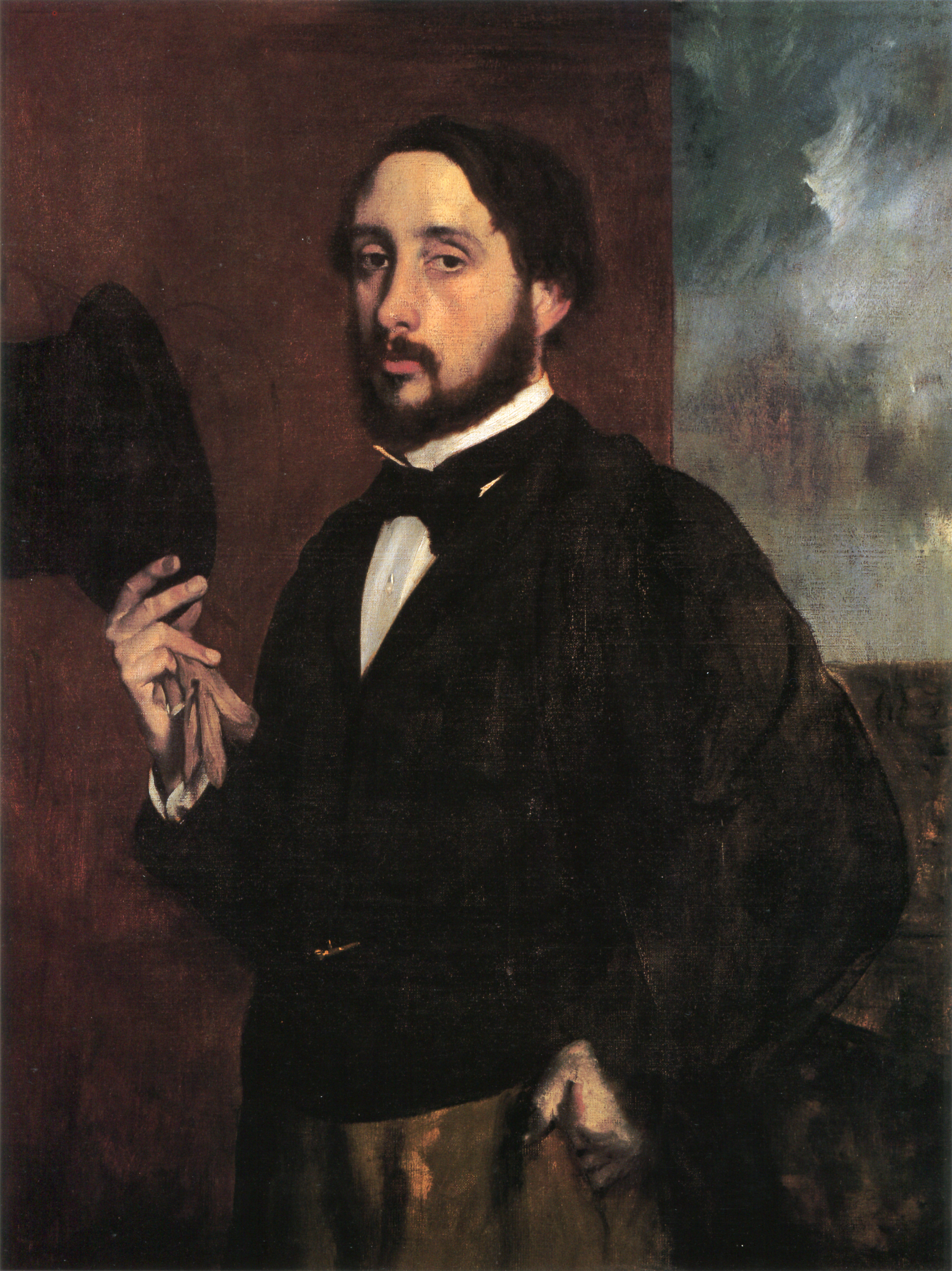
- Self-portrait (Degas Saluant), 1863
- Born: Hilaire-Germain-Edgar De Gas; 19 July 1834; Paris, France
- Died: 27 September 1917 (aged 83); Paris, France
- Known for: Painting, sculpture, drawing
- Notable work: The Bellelli Family (1858–1867); A Cotton Office in New Orleans (1873); The Ballet Class (1871–1874); The Absinthe (1875–1876); The Tub (1886)
- Movement: Impressionism

Signature
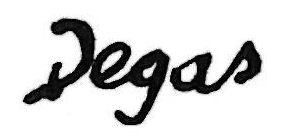

Edgar Degas (UK: /ˈdeɪɡɑː/, US: /deɪˈɡɑː, dəˈɡɑː/; born Hilaire-Germain-Edgar De Gas, French: [ilɛːʁ ʒɛʁmɛ̃ ɛdɡaʁ də ɡa]; 19 July 1834 – 27 September 1917) was a French Impressionist artist famous for his pastel drawings and oil paintings.

Degas also produced wax sculptures, prints, and drawings. Degas is especially identified with the subject of dance; more than half of his works depict dancers. Although Degas is regarded as one of the founders of Impressionism, he rejected the term, preferring to be called a realist, and did not paint outdoors as many Impressionists did.

Degas was a superb draftsman, and particularly masterly in depicting movement, as can be seen in his rendition of dancers and bathing female nudes. In addition to ballet dancers and bathing women, Degas painted racehorses and racing jockeys, as well as portraits. His portraits are notable for their psychological complexity and their portrayal of human isolation.

At the beginning of his career, Degas wanted to be a history painter, a calling for which he was well prepared by his rigorous academic training and close study of classical Western art. In his early thirties he changed course, and by bringing the traditional methods of a history painter to bear on contemporary subject matter, he became a classical painter of modern life.

== Early life ==
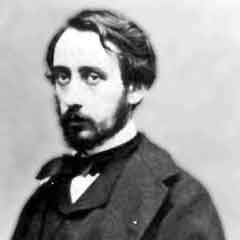
Edgar Degas c. 1855–1860

Degas was born in Paris, France, into a moderately wealthy family. He was the oldest of five children of Célestine Musson De Gas, a Creole from New Orleans, Louisiana, and Augustin De Gas, a banker. His maternal grandfather Germain Musson was born in Port-au-Prince, Haiti, of French descent, and had settled in New Orleans in 1810.

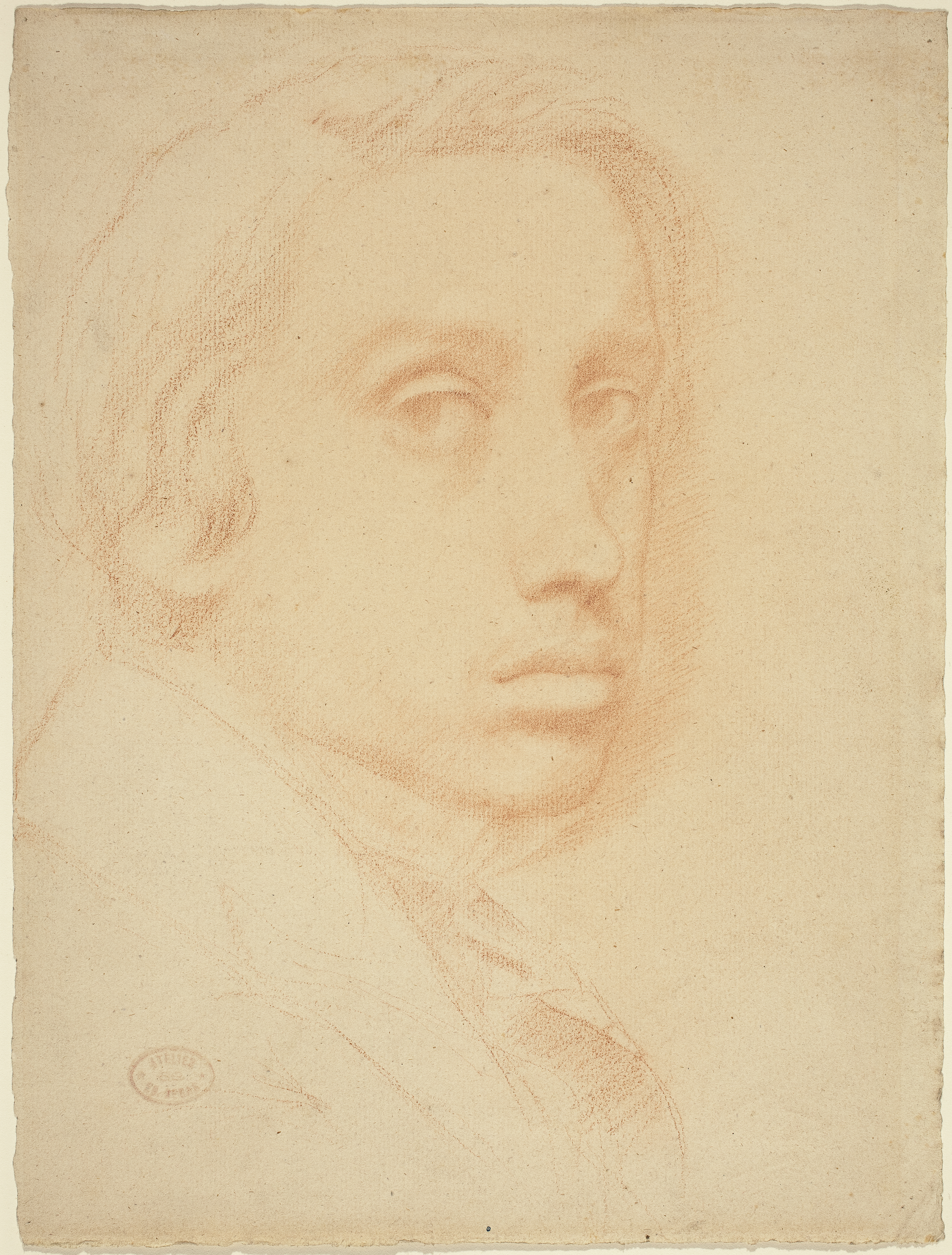
Edgar Degas, Self-Portrait, c. 1855. Red chalk on laid paper; 31 x 23.3 cm (12 3/16 x 9 3/16 in.) National Gallery of Art, Washington.

Degas (he adopted this less grandiose spelling of his family name when he became an adult) began his schooling at age eleven, enrolling in the Lycée Louis-le-Grand. His mother died when he was thirteen, and the main influences on him for the remainder of his youth were his father and several unmarried uncles. Degas began to paint early in life. By the time he graduated from the Lycée with a baccalauréat in literature in 1853, at age 18, he had turned a room in his home into an artist's studio. Upon graduating, he registered as a copyist in the Louvre Museum, but his father expected him to go to law school. Degas duly enrolled at the Faculty of Law of the University of Paris in November 1853 but applied little effort to his studies.

In 1855, he met Jean-Auguste-Dominique Ingres, whom he revered and whose advice he never forgot: "Draw lines, young man, and still more lines, both from life and from memory, and you will become a good artist." In April of that year Degas was admitted to the École des Beaux-Arts. He studied drawing there with Louis Lamothe, under whose guidance he flourished, following the style of Ingres.

In July 1856, Degas traveled to Italy, where he would remain for the next three years. In 1858, while staying with his aunt's family in Naples, he made the first studies for his early masterpiece The Bellelli Family. He also drew and painted numerous copies of works by Michelangelo, Raphael, Titian, and other Renaissance artists, but—contrary to conventional practice—he usually selected from an altarpiece a detail that had caught his attention: a secondary figure, or a head that he treated as a portrait.

== Artistic career ==
Upon his return to France in 1859, Degas moved into a Paris studio large enough to permit him to begin painting The Bellelli Family—an imposing canvas he intended for exhibition in the Salon, although it remained unfinished until 1867. He also began work on several history paintings: Alexander and Bucephalus and The Daughter of Jephthah in 1859–1860; Sémiramis Building Babylon in 1860; and Young Spartans Exercising around 1860. In 1861, Degas visited his childhood friend Paul Valpinçon in Ménil-Hubert-en-Exmes, and made the earliest of his many studies of horses. He exhibited at the Salon for the first time at the Salon of 1865, when the jury accepted his painting Scene of War in the Middle Ages, which attracted little attention.

Although he exhibited annually in the Salon during the next five years, he submitted no more history paintings, and his Scene from the Steeplechase: The Fallen Jockey (Salon of 1866) signaled his growing commitment to contemporary subject matter. The change in his art was influenced primarily by the example of Édouard Manet, whom Degas had met in 1864 (while both were copying the same Diego Velázquez portrait in the Louvre, according to a story that may be apocryphal).

Upon the outbreak of the Franco-Prussian War in 1870, Degas enlisted in the National Guard, where his partaking in the defense of Paris left him little time for painting. During rifle training his eyesight was found to be defective, and for the rest of his life his eye problems were a constant worry to him.

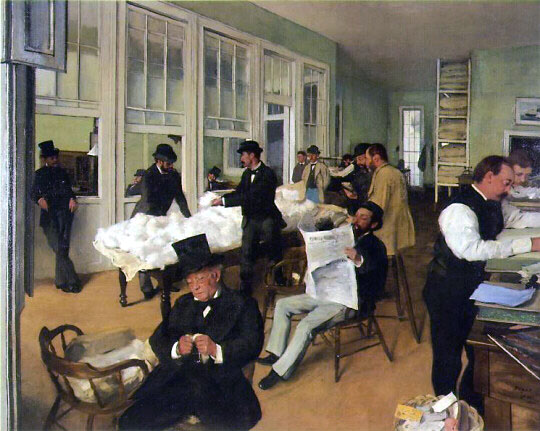
A Cotton Office in New Orleans, 1873

After the war, Degas began in 1872 an extended stay in New Orleans, where his brother René and a number of other relatives lived. Staying at the home of his Creole uncle, Michel Musson, on Esplanade Avenue, Degas produced a number of works, many depicting family members. One of Degas's New Orleans works, A Cotton Office in New Orleans, garnered favorable attention back in France, and was his only work purchased by a museum (the Pau) during his lifetime.

Degas returned to Paris in 1873, and his father died the following year, whereupon Degas learned that his brother René had amassed enormous business debts. To preserve his family's reputation, Degas sold his house and an art collection he had inherited and used the money to pay off his brother's debts. Dependent for the first time in his life on sales of his artwork for income, he produced much of his greatest work during the decade beginning in 1874. Disenchanted by now with the Salon, he joined a group of young artists who were organizing an independent exhibiting society. The group soon became known as the Impressionists.

Between 1874 and 1886, they mounted eight art shows, known as the Impressionist Exhibitions. Degas took a leading role in organizing the exhibitions, and he showed his work in all but one of them, despite his persistent conflicts with others in the group. He had little in common with Monet and the other landscape painters in the group, whom he mocked for painting outdoors. Conservative in his social attitudes, he abhorred the scandal created by the exhibitions, as well as the publicity and advertising that his colleagues sought. He also deeply disliked being associated with the term "Impressionist", which the press had coined and popularized, and insisted on including non-Impressionist artists such as Jean-Louis Forain and Jean-François Raffaëlli in the group's exhibitions. The resulting rancor within the group contributed to its disbanding in 1886.

As his financial situation improved through sales of his own work, he was able to indulge his passion for collecting works by artists he admired: old masters such as El Greco and such contemporaries as Manet, Cassatt, Pissarro, Cézanne, Gauguin, Van Gogh, and Édouard Brandon. Three artists he idolized, Ingres, Delacroix, and Daumier, were especially well represented in his collection.

In the late 1880s, Degas also developed a passion for photography. He photographed many of his friends, often by lamplight, as in his double portrait of Renoir and Mallarmé. Other photographs, depicting dancers and nudes, were used for reference in some of Degas's drawings, and paintings.

As the years passed, Degas became isolated, due in part to his belief that a painter could have no personal life. The Dreyfus Affair controversy brought his antisemitic leanings to the fore and he broke with all his Jewish friends. His argumentative nature was deplored by Renoir, who said of him: "What a creature he was, that Degas! All his friends had to leave him; I was one of the last to go, but even I couldn't stay till the end."

After 1890, Degas's eyesight, which had long troubled him, deteriorated further. Although he is known to have been working in pastel as late as the end of 1907, and is believed to have continued making sculptures as late as 1910, he apparently ceased working in 1912, when the impending demolition of his longtime residence on the rue Victor Massé forced him to move to quarters on the Boulevard de Clichy. He never married, and spent the last years of his life, nearly blind, restlessly wandering the streets of Paris before dying in September 1917.

== Artistic style ==
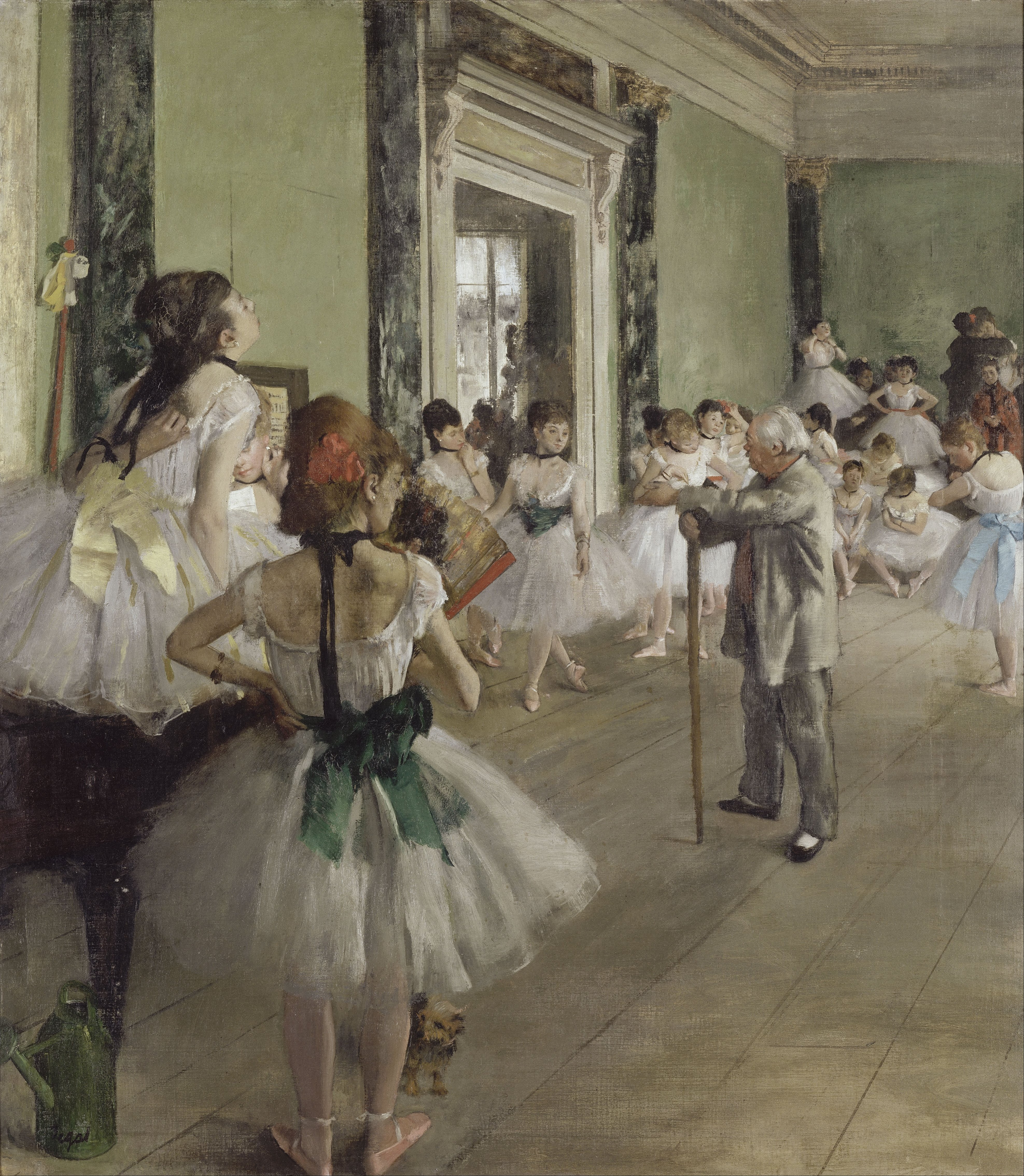
The Ballet Class (La Classe de Danse), 1873–1876, oil on canvas

Degas is often identified as an Impressionist, an understandable but insufficient description. Impressionism originated in the 1860s and 1870s and grew, in part, from the realism of painters such as Courbet and Corot. The Impressionists painted the realities of the world around them using bright, "dazzling" colors, concentrating primarily on the effects of light, and hoping to infuse their scenes with immediacy. They wanted to express their visual experience in that exact moment.

Technically, Degas differs from the Impressionists in that he continually belittled their practice of painting en plein air.

You know what I think of people who work out in the open. If I were the government I would have a special brigade of gendarmes to keep an eye on artists who paint landscapes from nature. Oh, I don't mean to kill anyone; just a little dose of bird-shot now and then as a warning.

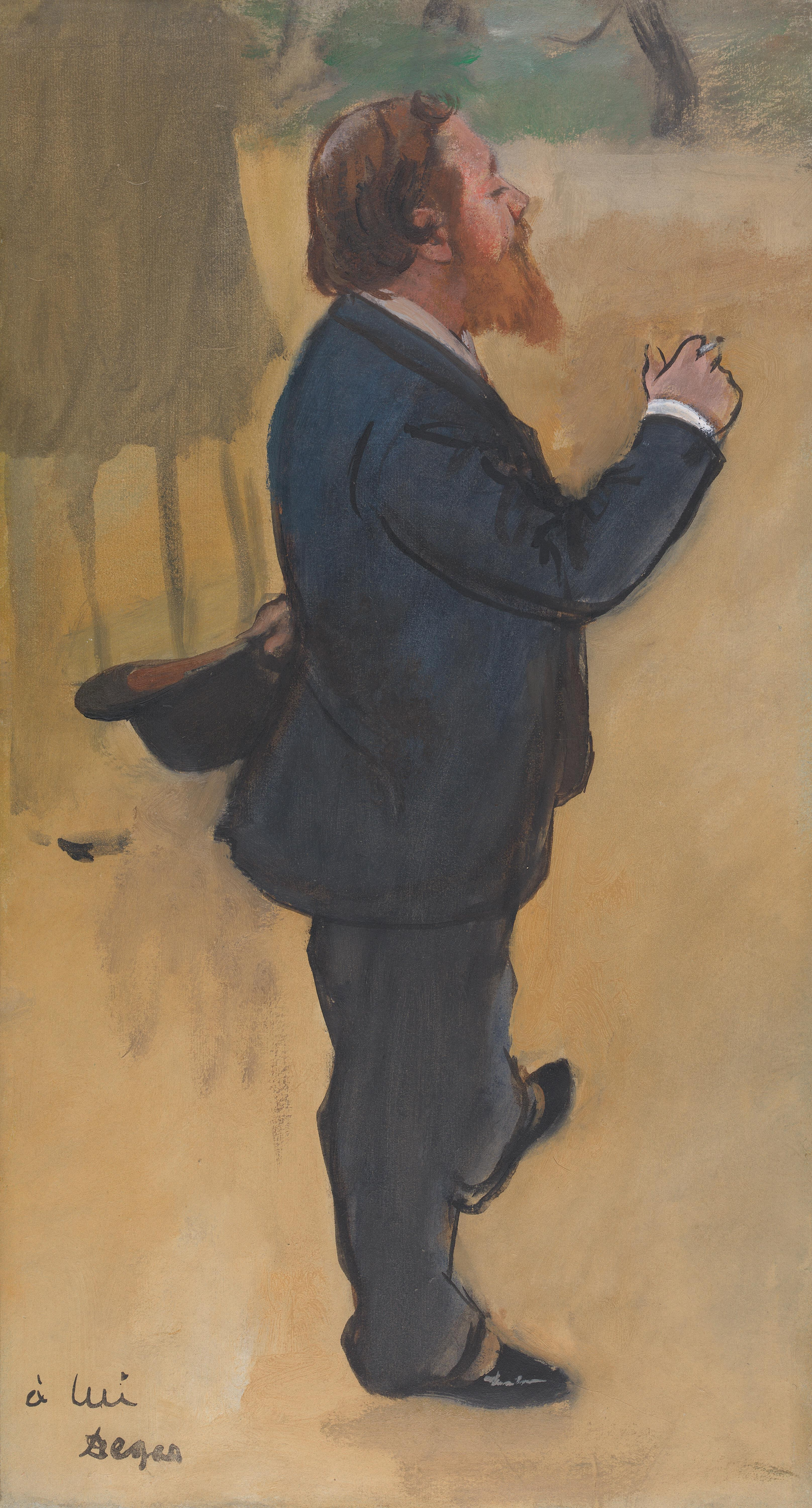
Carlo Pellegrini, c. 1876; watercolor, oil and pastel on paper

"He was often as anti-impressionist as the critics who reviewed the shows", according to art historian Carol Armstrong; as Degas himself explained, "no art was ever less spontaneous than mine. What I do is the result of reflection and of the study of the great masters; of inspiration, spontaneity, temperament, I know nothing." Nonetheless, he is described more accurately as an Impressionist than as a member of any other movement. His scenes of Parisian life, his off-center compositions, his experiments with color and form, and his friendship with several key Impressionist artists—most notably Mary Cassatt and Manet—all relate him intimately to the Impressionist movement.

Degas's style reflects his deep respect for the old masters (he was an enthusiastic copyist well into middle age) and his great admiration for Ingres and Delacroix. He was also a collector of Japanese prints, whose compositional principles influenced his work, as did the vigorous realism of popular illustrators such as Daumier and Gavarni. Although famous for horses and dancers, Degas began with conventional historical paintings such as The Daughter of Jephthah (c. 1859–61) and Young Spartans Exercising (c. 1860–62), in which his gradual progress toward a less idealized treatment of the figure is already apparent. During his early career, Degas also painted portraits of individuals and groups; an example of the latter is The Bellelli Family (c. 1858–67), an ambitious and psychologically poignant portrayal of his aunt, her husband, and their children. In this painting, as in Young Spartans Exercising and many later works, Degas was drawn to the tensions present between men and women. In his early paintings, Degas already evidenced the mature style that he would later develop more fully by cropping subjects awkwardly and by choosing unusual viewpoints.

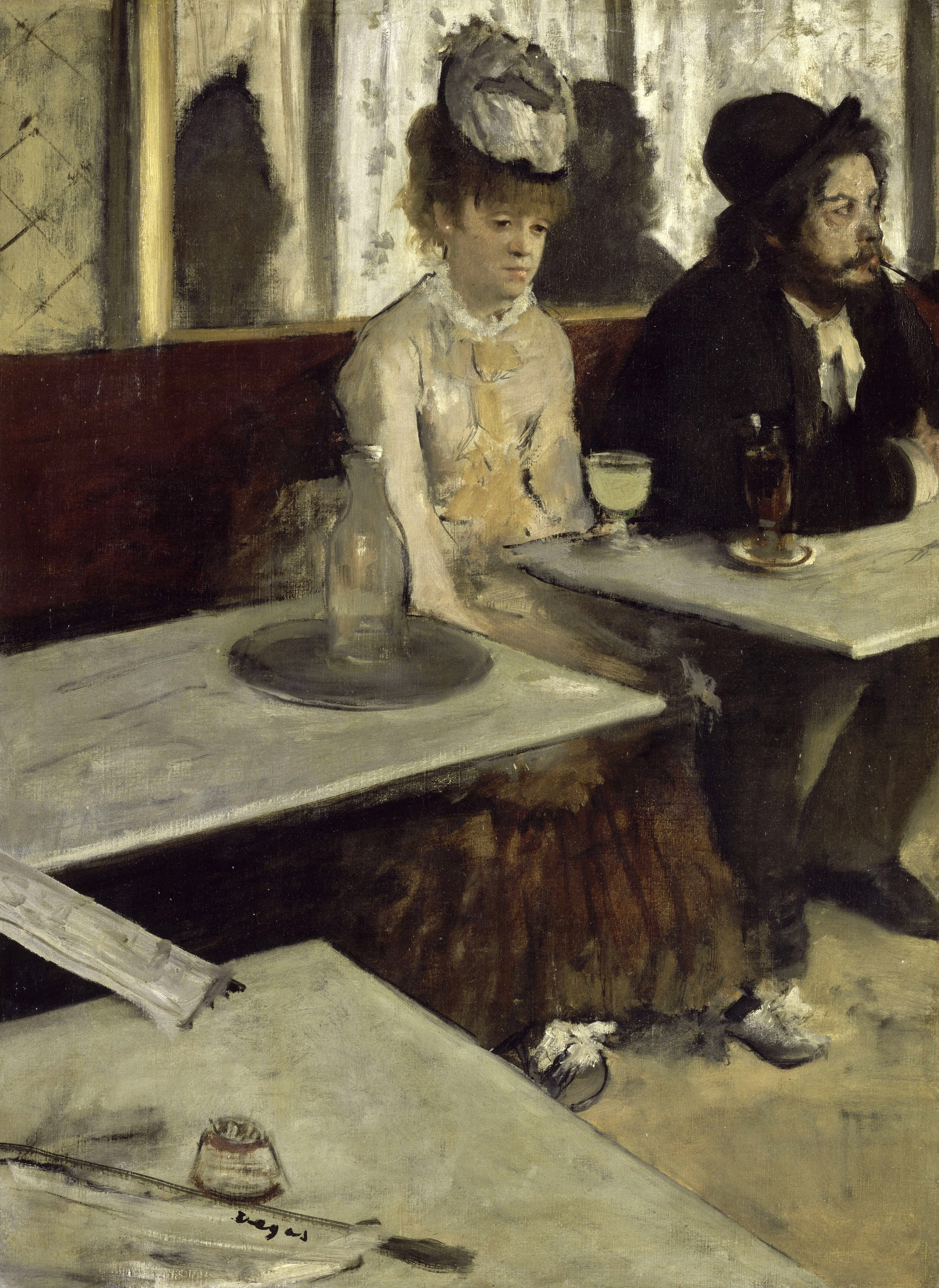
L'Absinthe, 1876, oil on canvas

By the late 1860s, Degas had shifted from his initial forays into history painting to an original observation of contemporary life. Racecourse scenes provided an opportunity to depict horses and their riders in a modern context. He began to paint women at work, milliners and laundresses. His milliner series is interpreted as artistic self-reflection.

Mlle. Fiocre in the Ballet La Source, exhibited in the Salon of 1868, was his first major work to introduce a subject with which he would become especially identified, dancers. In many subsequent paintings, dancers were shown backstage or in rehearsal, emphasizing their status as professionals doing a job. From 1870 Degas increasingly painted ballet subjects, partly because they sold well and provided him with needed income after his brother's debts had left the family bankrupt. Degas began to paint café life as well, in works such as L'Absinthe and Singer with a Glove. His paintings often hinted at narrative content in a way that was highly ambiguous; for example, Interior (which has also been called The Rape) has presented a conundrum to art historians in search of a literary source—Thérèse Raquin has been suggested—but it may be a depiction of prostitution.

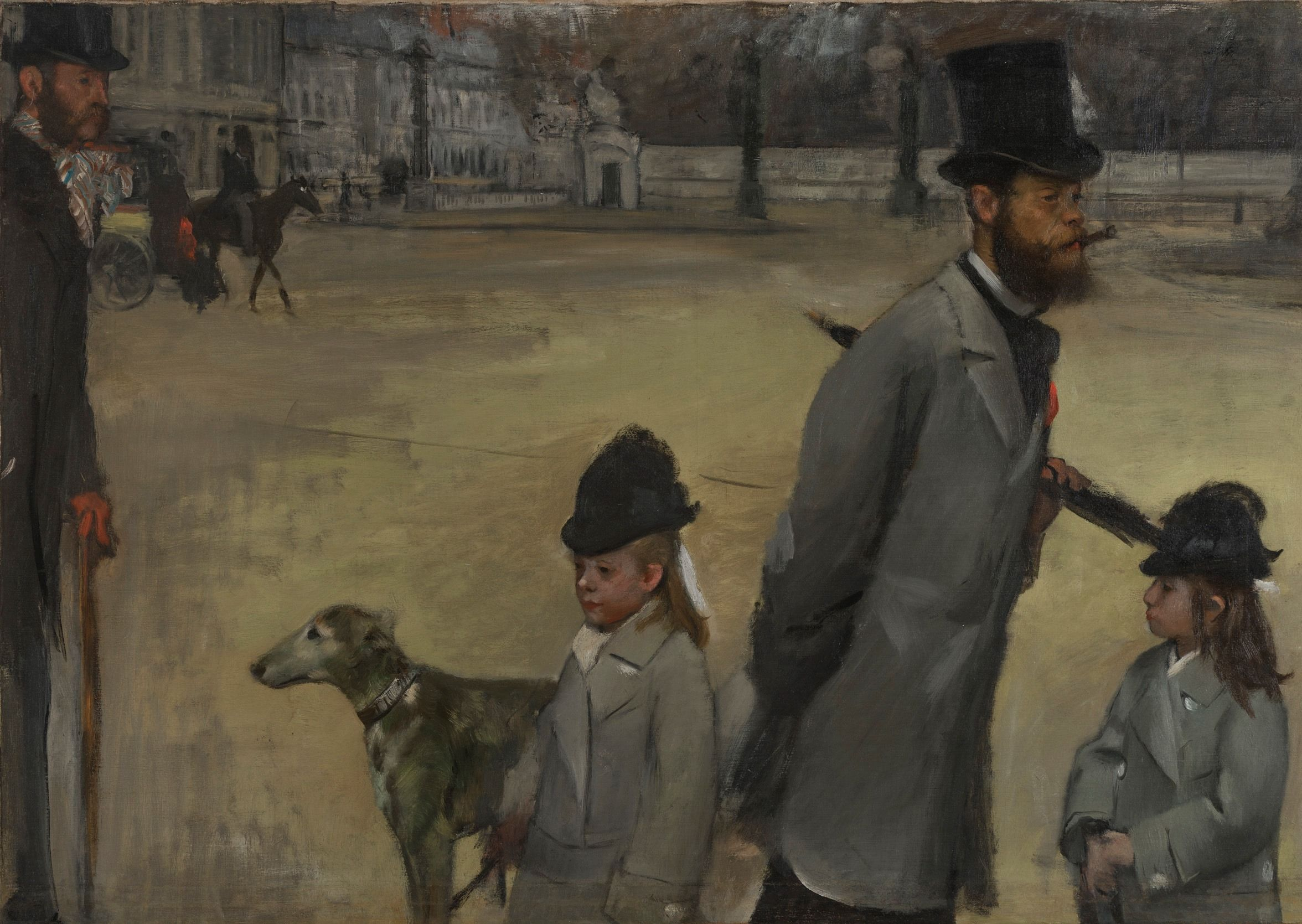
Place de la Concorde, 1875, oil on canvas, Hermitage Museum, St. Petersburg

As his subject matter changed, so, too, did Degas's technique. The dark palette that bore the influence of Dutch painting gave way to the use of vivid colors and bold brushstrokes. Paintings such as Place de la Concorde read as "snapshots," freezing moments of time to portray them accurately, imparting a sense of movement. The lack of color in the 1874 Ballet Rehearsal on Stage and the 1876 The Ballet Instructor can be said to link with his interest in the new technique of photography. The changes to his palette, brushwork, and sense of composition all evidence the influence that both the Impressionist movement and modern photography, with its spontaneous images and off-kilter angles, had on his work.

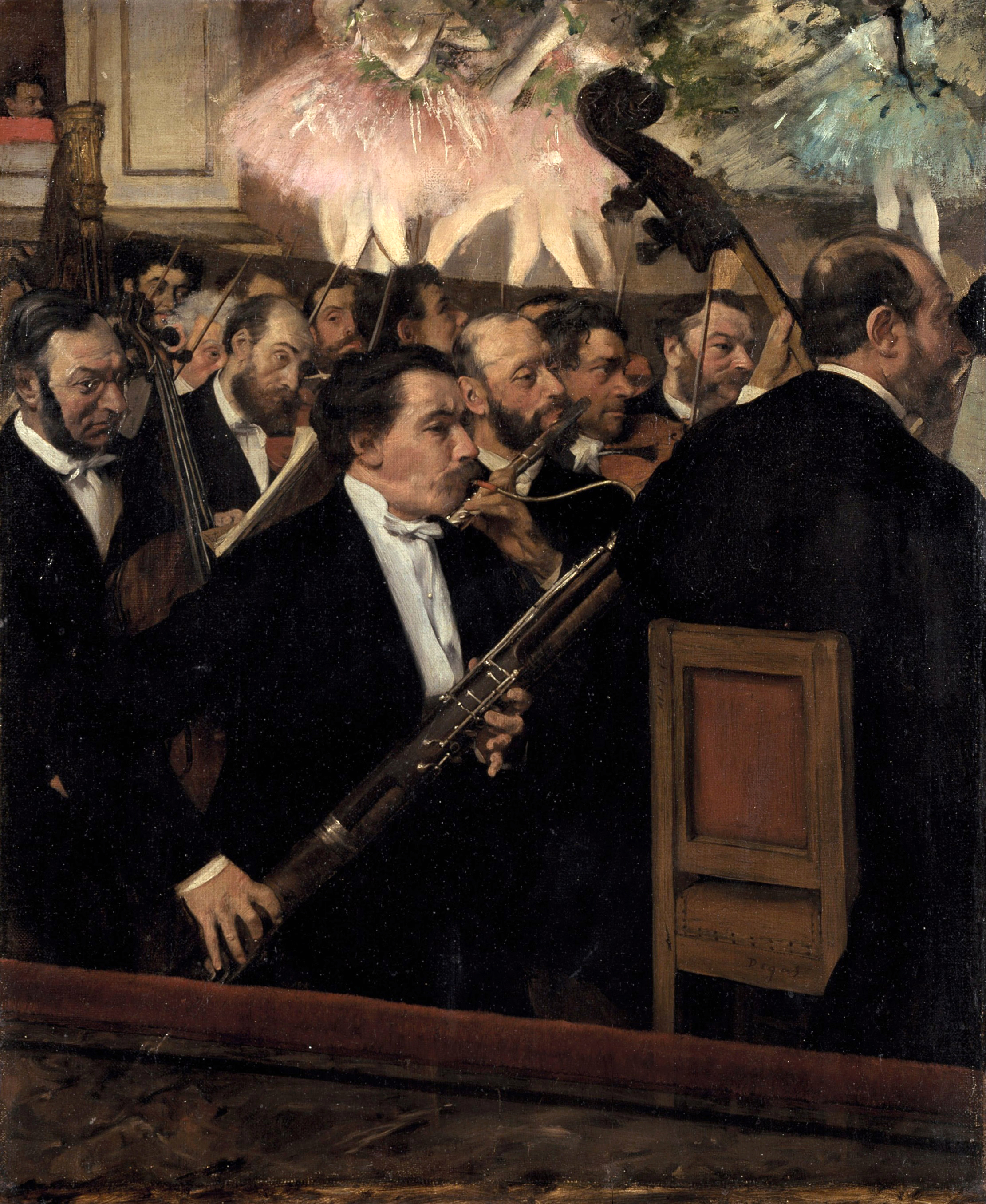
The Orchestra at the Opera, 1872, oil on canvas

Blurring the distinction between portraiture and genre pieces, he painted his bassoonist friend, Désiré Dihau, in The Orchestra at the Opera (c. 1870) as one of fourteen musicians in an orchestra pit, viewed as though by a member of the audience. Above the musicians can be seen only the legs and tutus of the dancers onstage, their figures cropped by the edge of the painting. Art historian Charles Stuckey has compared the viewpoint to that of a distracted spectator at a ballet, and says that "it is Degas' fascination with the depiction of movement, including the movement of a spectator's eyes as during a random glance, that is properly speaking 'Impressionist'."

Degas's mature style is distinguished by conspicuously unfinished passages, even in otherwise tightly rendered paintings. He frequently blamed his eye troubles for his inability to finish, an explanation that met with some skepticism from colleagues and collectors who reasoned, as Stuckey explains, that "his pictures could hardly have been executed by anyone with inadequate vision". The artist provided another clue when he described his predilection "to begin a hundred things and not finish one of them", and was in any case notoriously reluctant to consider a painting complete.

His interest in portraiture led Degas to study carefully the ways in which a person's social stature or form of employment may be revealed by their physiognomy, posture, dress, and other attributes. In his 1879 Portraits, At the Stock Exchange, he portrayed a group of Jewish businessmen with a hint of anti-Semitism. In 1881, he exhibited two pastels, Criminal Physiognomies, that depicted juvenile gang members recently convicted of murder in the "Abadie Affair". Degas had attended their trial with sketchbook in hand, and his numerous drawings of the defendants reveal his interest in the atavistic features thought by some 19th-century scientists to be evidence of innate criminality. In his paintings of dancers and laundresses, he reveals their occupations not only by their dress and activities but also by their body type: his ballerinas exhibit an athletic physicality, while his laundresses are heavy and solid.

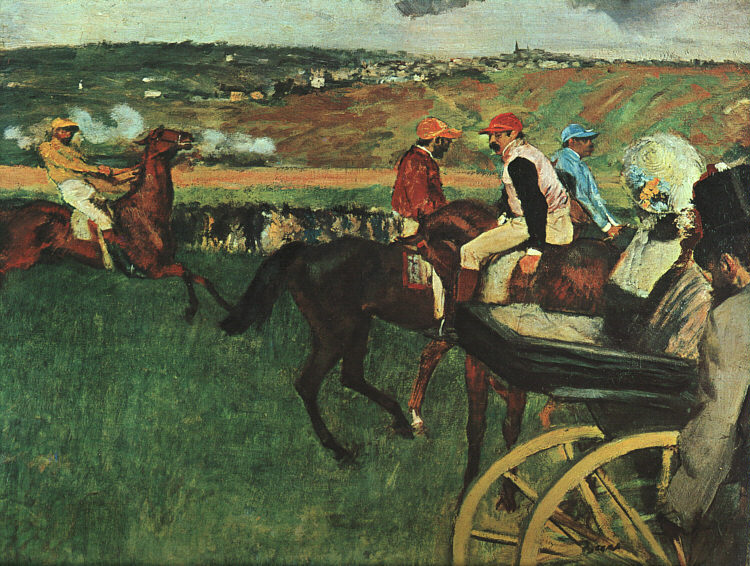
At the Races, 1877–1880, oil on canvas, Musée d'Orsay, Paris

By the later 1870s, Degas had mastered not only the traditional medium of oil on canvas, but pastel as well. The dry medium, which he applied in complex layers and textures, enabled him more easily to reconcile his facility for line with a growing interest in expressive color.

In the mid-1870s, he also returned to the medium of etching, which he had neglected for ten years. At first he was guided in this by his old friend Ludovic-Napoléon Lepic, himself an innovator in its use, and began experimenting with lithography and monotype.

He produced some 300 monotypes over two periods, from the mid-1870s to the mid-1880s and again in the early 1890s.

He was especially fascinated by the effects produced by monotype and frequently reworked the printed images with pastel. By 1880, sculpture had become one more strand to Degas's continuing endeavor to explore different media, although the artist displayed only one sculpture publicly during his lifetime.

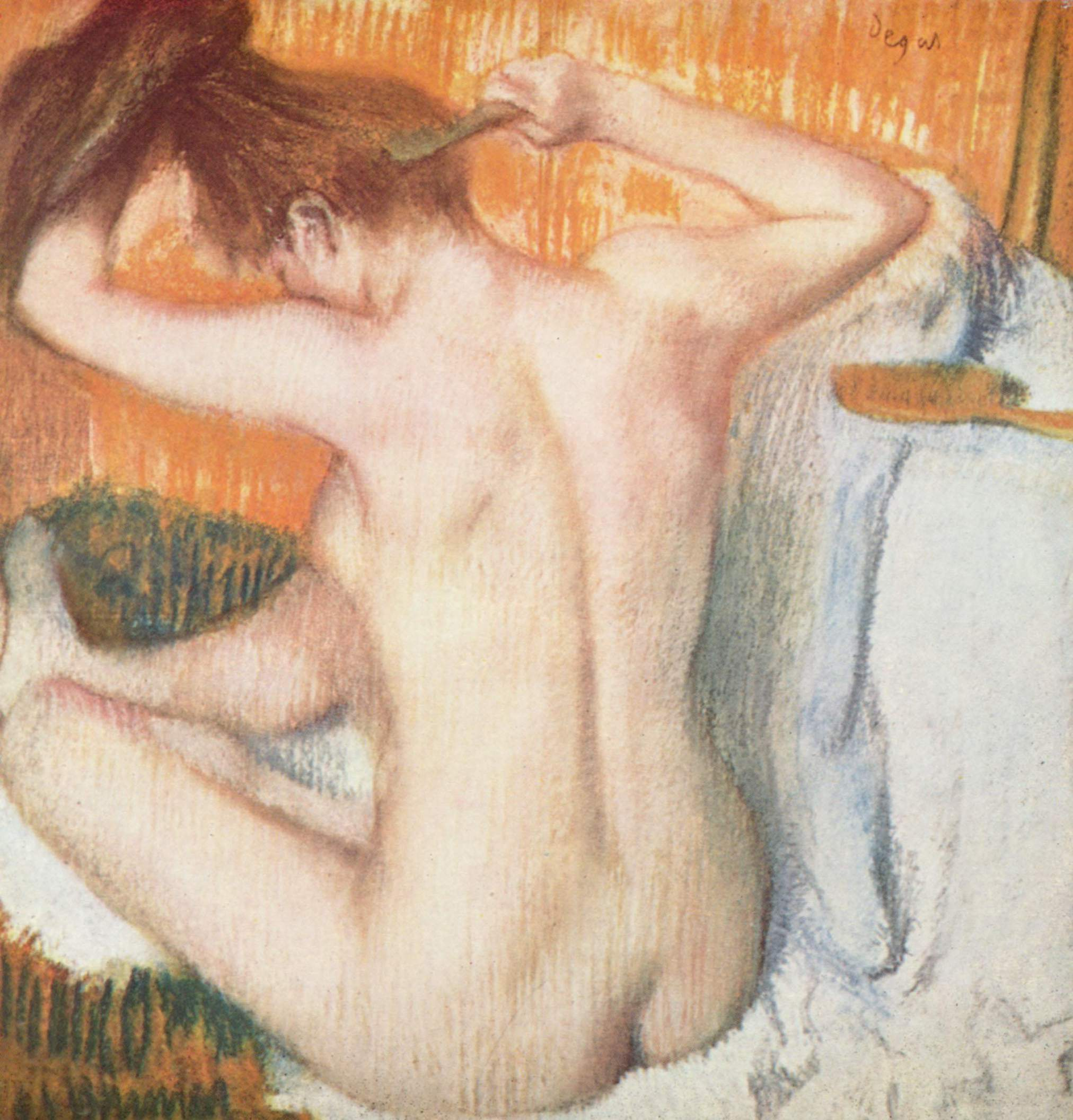
La Toilette (Woman Combing Her Hair), c. 1884–1886, pastel on paper, Hermitage Museum, St. Petersburg

These changes in media engendered the paintings that Degas would produce in later life. Degas began to draw and paint women drying themselves with towels, combing their hair, and bathing (see: After the Bath, Woman drying herself). The strokes that model the form are scribbled more freely than before; backgrounds are simplified.

The meticulous naturalism of his youth gave way to an increasing abstraction of form. Except for his characteristically brilliant draftsmanship and obsession with the figure, the pictures created in this late period of his life bear little superficial resemblance to his early paintings. In point of fact, these paintings—created late in his life and after the heyday of the Impressionist movement—most vividly use the coloristic techniques of Impressionism.

For all the stylistic evolution, certain features of Degas's work remained the same throughout his life. He always painted indoors, preferring to work in his studio from memory, photographs, or live models. The figure remained his primary subject; his few landscapes were produced from memory or imagination. It was not unusual for him to repeat a subject many times, varying the composition or treatment. He was a deliberative artist whose works, as Andrew Forge has written, "were prepared, calculated, practiced, developed in stages. They were made up of parts. The adjustment of each part to the whole, their linear arrangement, was the occasion for infinite reflection and experiment." Degas explained, "In art, nothing should look like chance, not even movement". He was most interested in the presentation of his paintings, patronizing Pierre Cluzel as a framer, and disliking ornate styles of the day, often insisting on his choices for the framing as a condition of purchase.

== Sculpture ==
External videos
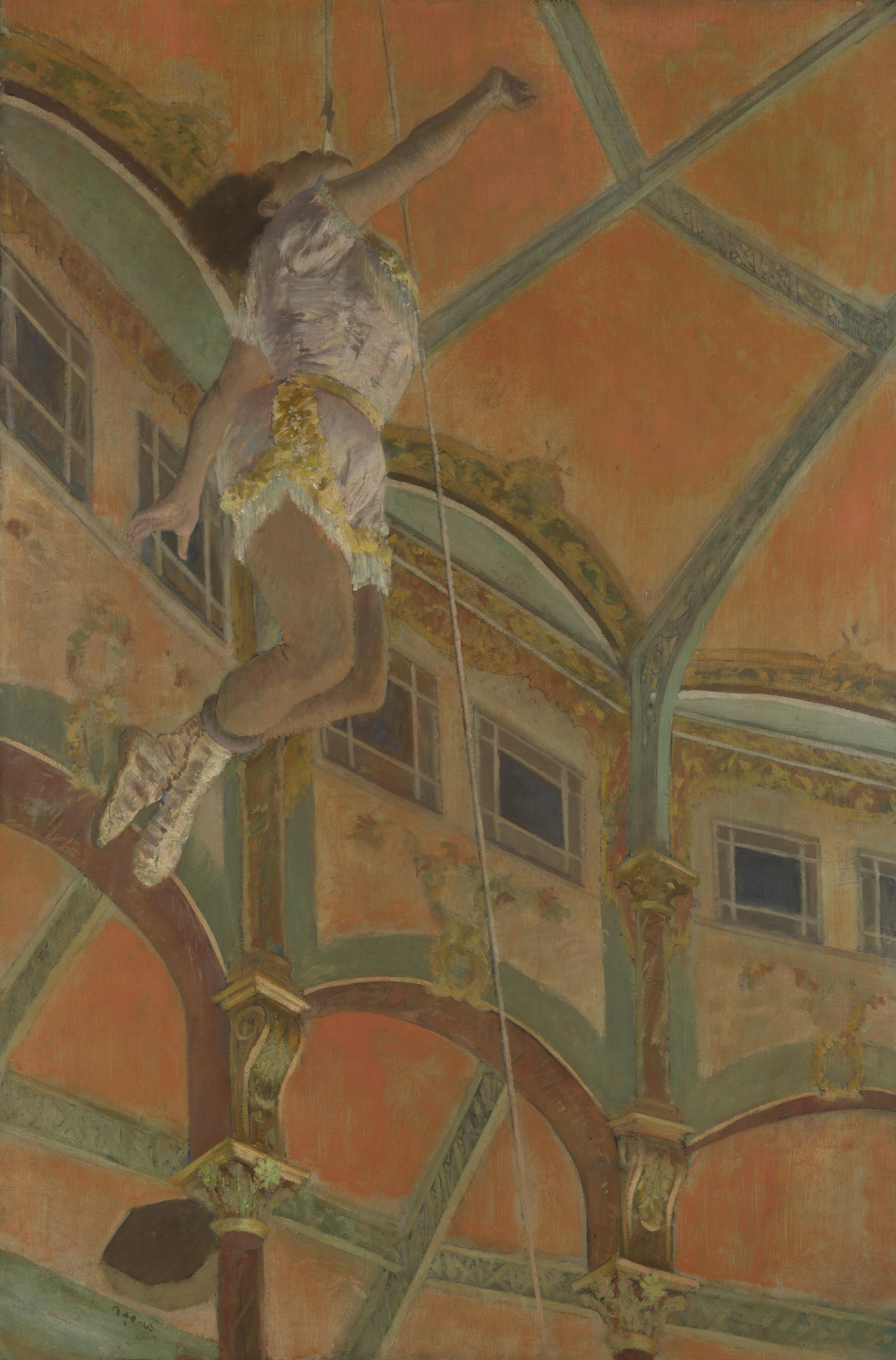
- Miss La La at the Cirque Fernando, (1879) National Gallery, London
- Edgar Degas's Studies of Circus Performer, Miss Lala, Getty Museum
- Degas' The Dance Class, Smarthistory
- Video Postcard: The Millinery Shop (1879/86) on YouTube, Art Institute of Chicago

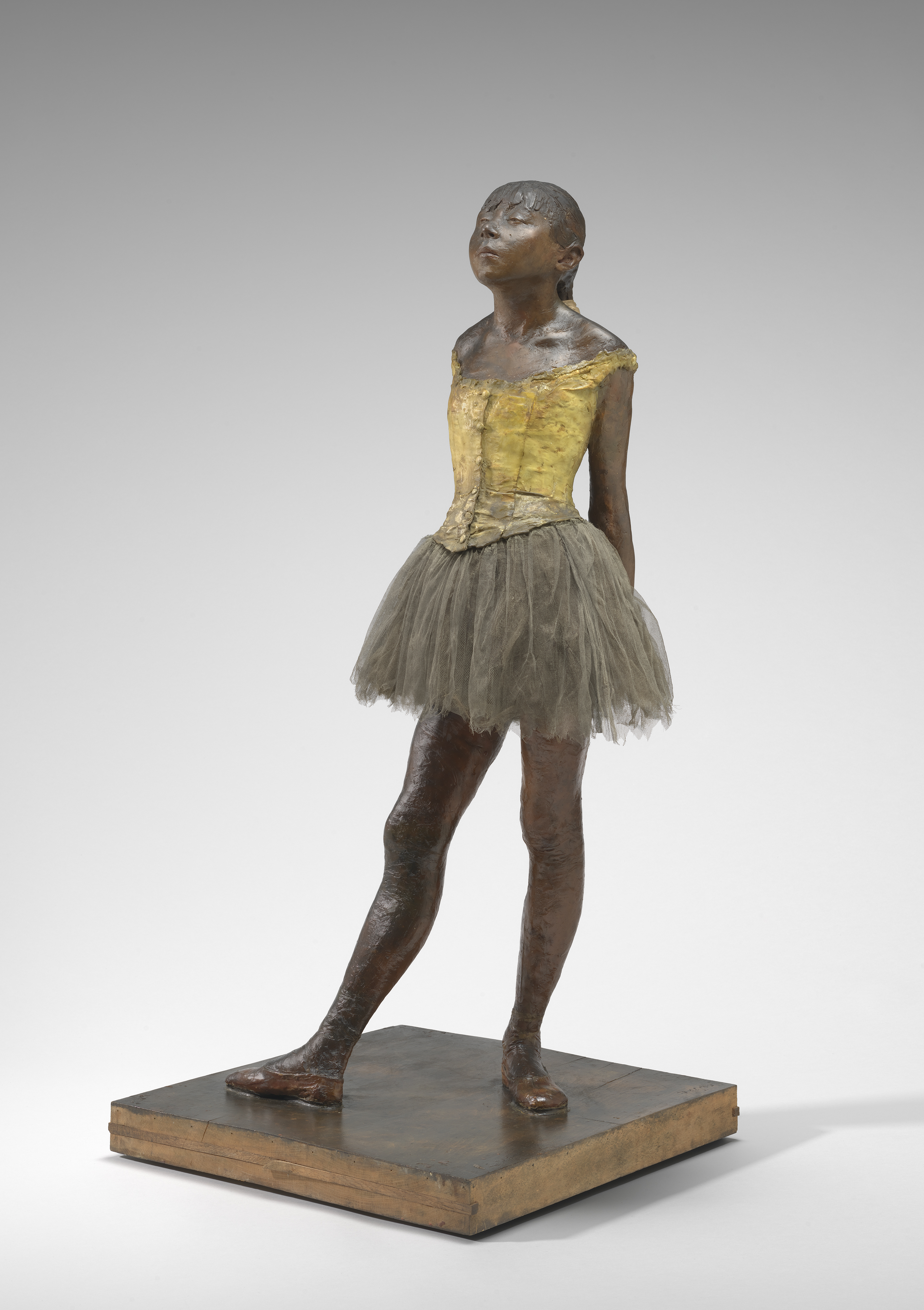
Little Dancer Aged Fourteen, 1878–1881, National Gallery of Art

Degas's only showing of sculpture during his life took place in 1881 when he exhibited The Little Dancer of Fourteen Years, which he had created using Marie van Goethem as a model. A nearly life-size wax figure with real hair and dressed in a cloth tutu, it provoked a strong reaction from critics, most of whom found its realism extraordinary but denounced the dancer as ugly. In a review, J.-K. Huysmans wrote: "The terrible reality of this statuette evidently produces uneasiness in the spectators; all their notions about sculpture, about those cold inanimate whitenesses ... are here overturned. The fact is that with his first attempt Monsieur Degas has revolutionized the traditions of sculpture as he has long since shaken the conventions of painting."

Degas created a substantial number of other sculptures during a span of four decades, but they remained unseen by the public until a posthumous exhibition in 1918. Neither The Little Dancer of Fourteen Years nor any of Degas's other sculptures were cast in bronze during the artist's lifetime. Degas scholars have agreed that the sculptures were not created as aids to painting, although the artist habitually explored ways of linking graphic art and oil painting, drawing and pastel, sculpture and photography. Degas assigned the same significance to sculpture as to drawing: "Drawing is a way of thinking, modelling another".

After Degas's death, his heirs found in his studio 150 wax sculptures, many in disrepair. They consulted foundry owner Adrien Hébrard, who concluded that 74 of the waxes could be cast in bronze. It is assumed that, except for the Little Dancer Aged Fourteen, all Degas bronzes worldwide are cast from surmoulages (i.e., cast from bronze masters). A surmoulage bronze is a bit smaller, and shows less surface detail, than its original bronze mold. The Hébrard Foundry cast the bronzes from 1919 until 1936, and closed down in 1937, shortly before Hébrard's death.

In 2004, a little-known group of 73 plaster casts, more or less closely resembling Degas's original wax sculptures, was presented as having been discovered among the materials bought by the Airaindor Foundry (later known as Airaindor-Valsuani) from Hébrard's descendants. Bronzes cast from these plasters were issued between 2004 and 2016 by Airaindor-Valsuani in editions inconsistently marked and thus of unknown size. There has been substantial controversy concerning the authenticity of these plasters as well as the circumstances and date of their creation as proposed by their promoters. While several museum and academic professionals accept them as presented, most of the recognized Degas scholars have declined to comment.

== Personality and politics ==
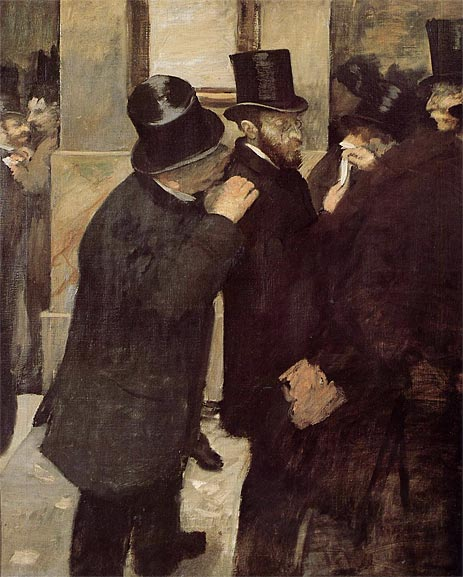
Portraits at the Stock Exchange, 1879

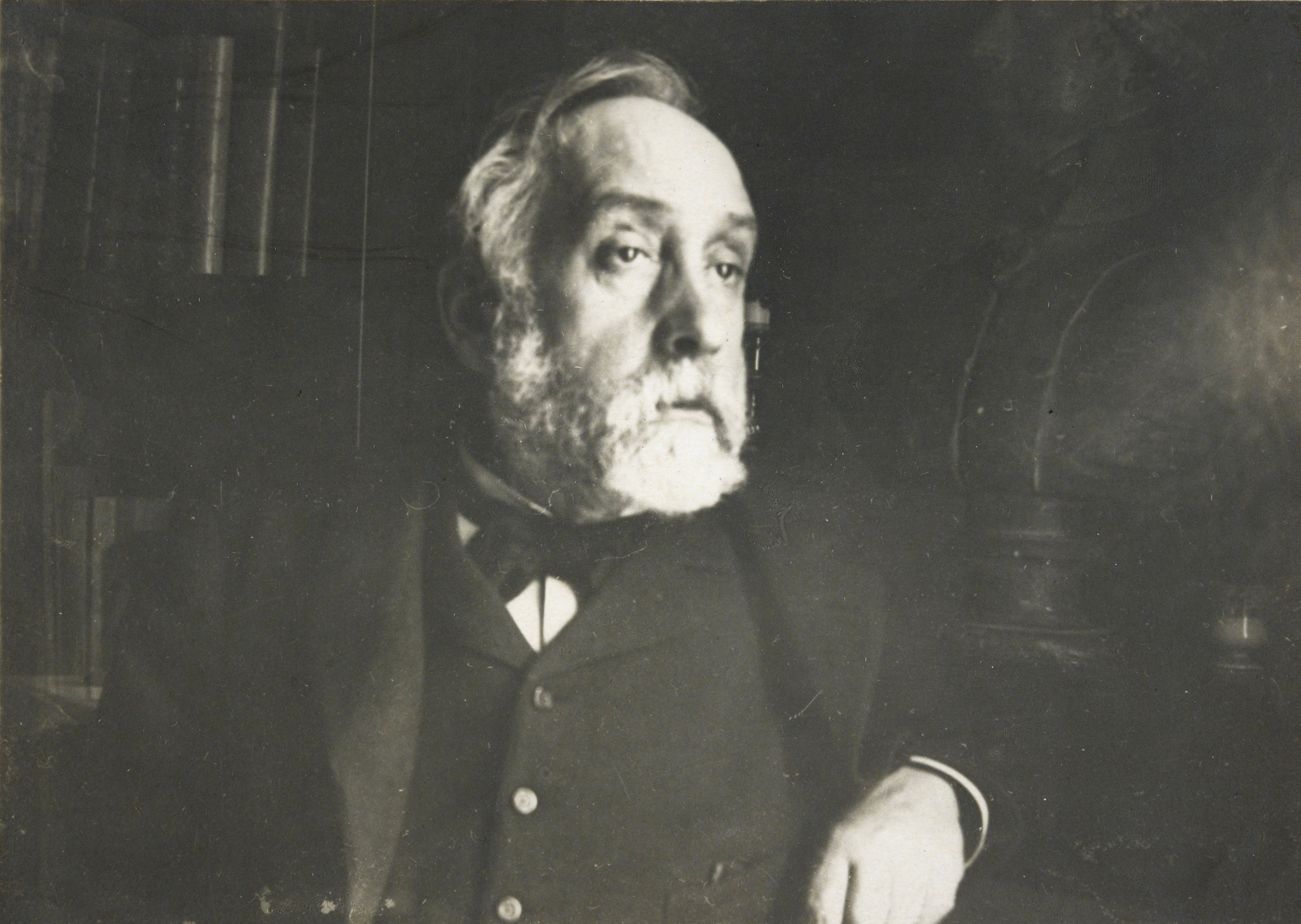
Self-portrait (photograph), c. 1895

Degas, who believed that "the artist must live alone, and his private life must remain unknown", lived an outwardly uneventful life. In company he was known for his wit, which could often be cruel. He was characterized as an "old curmudgeon" by the novelist George Moore, and he deliberately cultivated his reputation as a misanthropic bachelor. When he was fifty, he wrote in a letter, "Fundamentally, I don't have much affection.... Thus speaks a man who wants to finish his life and die all alone, with no happiness whatever". In some of his paintings, such as The Bellelli Family, Interior, and Sulking, "the left is, so to speak, the female side of the canvas—it is separated from the right [the male side] ... [and] the element of hostility between the sexes is apparent".

In the 1870s, Degas gravitated towards the republican circles of Léon Gambetta. However, his republicanism did not come untainted, and signs of the prejudice and irritability which would overtake him in old age were occasionally manifested. He fired a model upon learning she was Protestant. Although Degas painted a number of Jewish subjects from 1865 to 1870, his 1879 painting Portraits at the Stock Exchange may be a watershed in his political opinions. The painting is a portrait of the Jewish banker Ernest May—who may have commissioned the work and was its first owner—and is widely regarded as anti-Semitic by modern experts. The facial features of the banker in profile have been directly compared to those in the antisemitic cartoons rampant in Paris at the time, while those of the background characters have drawn comparisons to Degas's earlier work Criminal Physiognomies.

The Dreyfus Affair, which divided opinion in Paris from the 1890s to the early 1900s, intensified his antisemitism. By the mid-1890s, he had broken off relations with all of his Jewish friends, publicly disavowed his previous friendships with Jewish artists, and refused to use models who he believed might be Jewish. He remained an outspoken antisemite and member of the antisemitic "Anti-Dreyfusards" until his death.

== Reputation ==
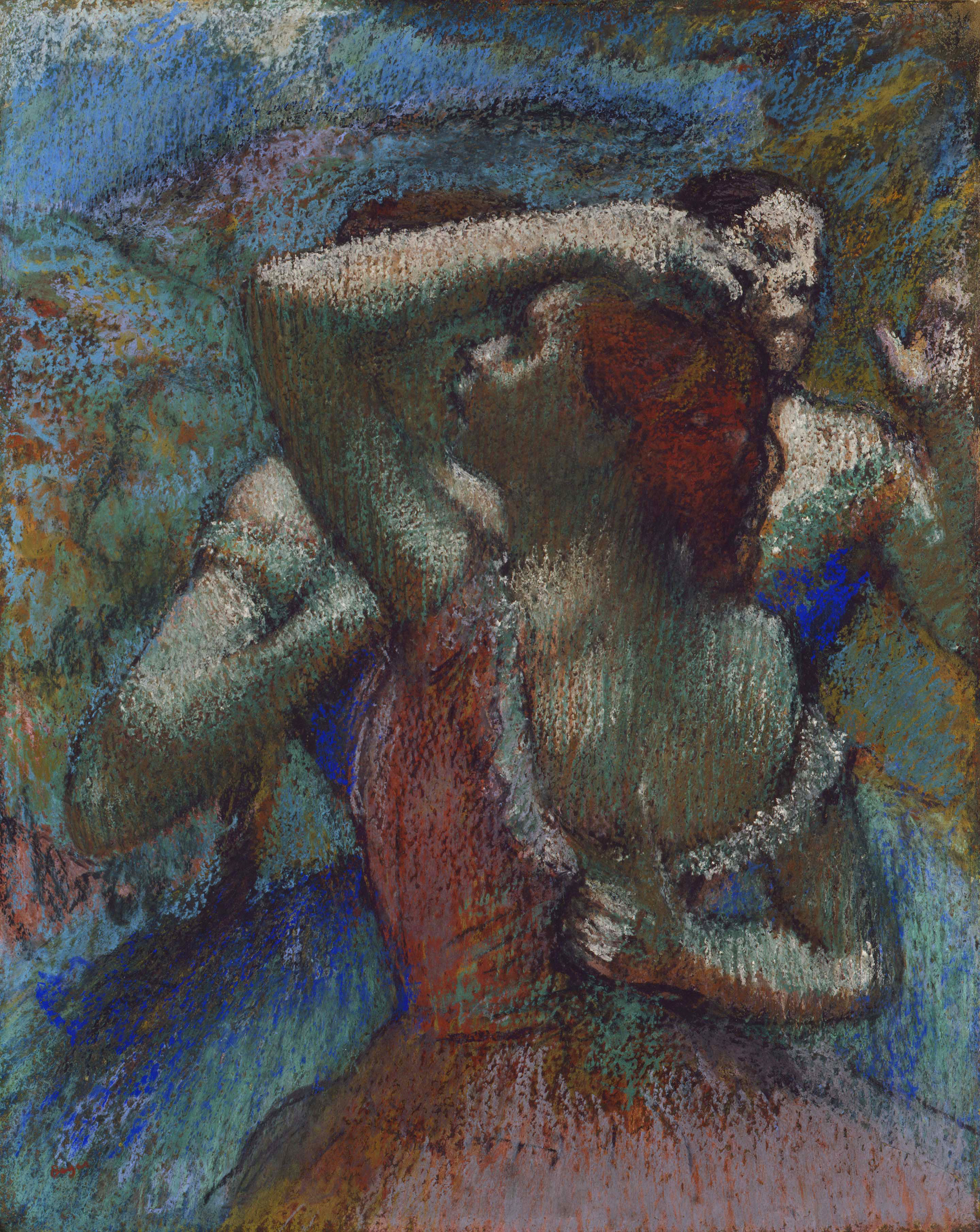
Dancers, 1900, Princeton University Art Museum

During his life, public reception of Degas's work ranged from admiration to contempt. As a promising artist in the conventional mode, Degas had a number of paintings accepted in the Salon between 1865 and 1870. These works received praise from Pierre Puvis de Chavannes and the critic Jules-Antoine Castagnary. He soon joined forces with the Impressionists, however, and rejected the rigid rules and judgments of the Salon.

Degas's work was controversial, but was generally admired for its draftsmanship. His La Petite Danseuse de Quatorze Ans, or Little Dancer of Fourteen Years, which he displayed at the sixth Impressionist exhibition in 1881, was probably his most controversial piece; some critics decried what they thought its "appalling ugliness" while others saw in it a "blossoming".

In part Degas' originality consisted in disregarding the smooth, full surfaces and contours of classical sculpture ... [and] in garnishing his little statue with real hair and clothing made to scale like the accoutrements for a doll. These relatively "real" additions heightened the illusion, but they also posed searching questions, such as what can be referred to as "real" when art is concerned.

The suite of pastels depicting nudes that Degas exhibited in the eighth Impressionist Exhibition in 1886 produced "the most concentrated body of critical writing on the artist during his lifetime ... The overall reaction was positive and laudatory".

Recognized as an important artist in his lifetime, Degas is now considered "one of the founders of Impressionism". Though his work crossed many stylistic boundaries, his involvement with the other major figures of Impressionism and their exhibitions, his dynamic paintings and sketches of everyday life and activities, and his bold color experiments, served to finally tie him to the Impressionist movement as one of its greatest artists.

Although Degas had no formal pupils, he greatly influenced several important painters, most notably Jean-Louis Forain, Mary Cassatt, and Walter Sickert; his greatest admirer may have been Henri de Toulouse-Lautrec.

Degas's paintings, pastels, drawings, and sculptures are on prominent display in many museums, and have been the subject of many museum exhibitions and retrospectives. Recent exhibitions include Degas: Drawings and Sketchbooks (The Morgan Library, 2010); Picasso Looks at Degas (Museu Picasso de Barcelona, 2010); Degas and the Nude (Museum of Fine Arts, Boston, 2011); Degas' Method (Ny Carlsberg Glyptotek, 2013); Degas's Little Dancer (National Gallery of Art, Washington D.C., 2014); Degas: A Passion for Perfection (Fitzwilliam Museum, Cambridge, 2017–2018); and Manet / Degas at the Musée d'Orsay and then the Metropolitan Museum of Art in 2023 and into 2024.

== Relationship with Mary Cassatt ==
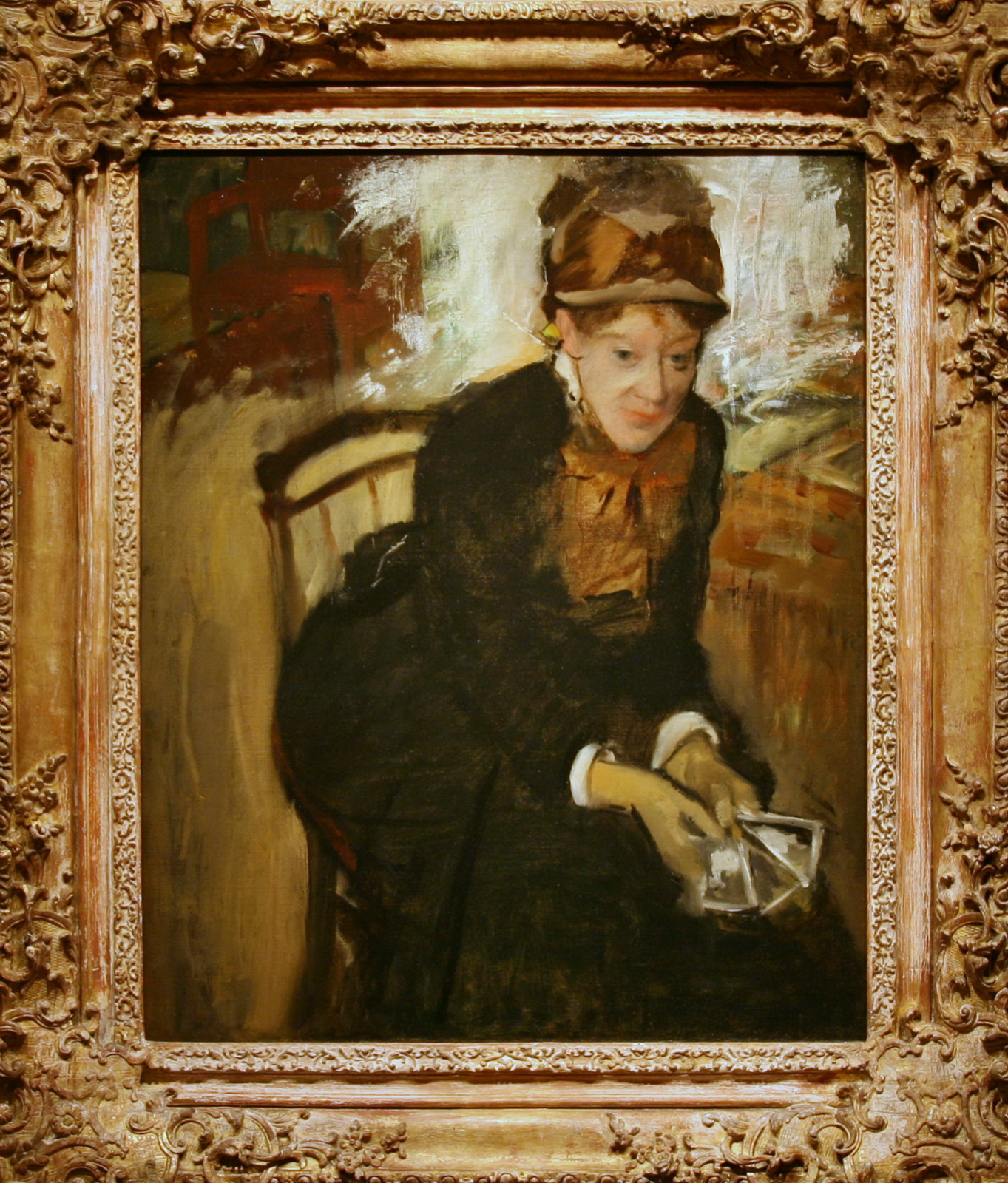
Edgar Degas, Mary Cassatt Seated, Holding Cards, c. 1880–1884, oil on canvas, National Portrait Gallery, Washington DC (NPG.84.34)

In 1877, Degas invited Mary Cassatt to exhibit in the third Impressionist exhibition. He had admired a portrait (Ida) she exhibited in the Salon of 1874, and the two formed a friendship. They had much in common: they shared similar tastes in art and literature, came from affluent backgrounds, had studied painting in Italy, and both were independent, never marrying. Both regarded themselves as figure painters, and the art historian George Shackelford suggests they were influenced by the art critic Louis Edmond Duranty's appeal in his pamphlet The New Painting for a revitalization in figure painting: "Let us take leave of the stylized human body, which is treated like a vase. What we need is the characteristic modern person in his clothes, in the midst of his social surroundings, at home or out in the street."

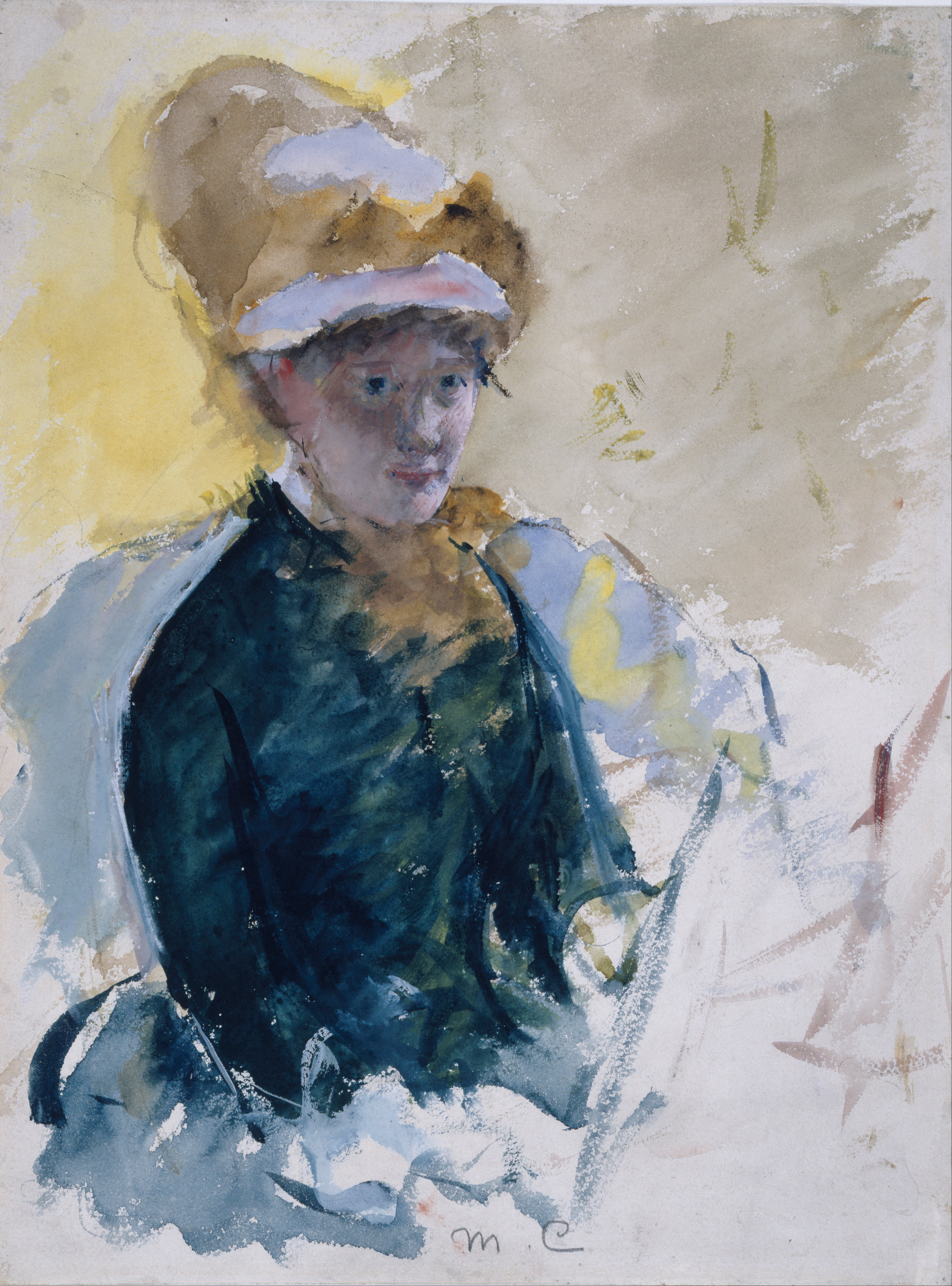
Mary Cassatt, Self-Portrait, c. 1880, gouache and watercolor over graphite on paper, National Portrait Gallery, Washington DC (NPG.76.33)

After Cassatt's parents and sister Lydia joined Cassatt in Paris in 1877, Degas, Cassatt, and Lydia were often to be seen at the Louvre studying artworks together. Degas produced two prints, notable for their technical innovation, depicting Cassatt at the Louvre looking at artworks while Lydia reads a guidebook. These were destined for a prints journal planned by Degas (together with Camille Pissarro and others), which never came to fruition. Cassatt frequently posed for Degas, notably for his millinery series trying on hats.

Degas introduced Cassatt to pastel and engraving, while for her part Cassatt was instrumental in helping Degas sell his paintings and promoting his reputation in the United States. Cassatt and Degas worked most closely together in the fall and winter of 1879–80 when Cassatt was mastering her printmaking technique. Degas owned a small printing press, and by day she worked at his studio using his tools and press. However, in April 1880, Degas abruptly withdrew from the prints journal they had been collaborating on, and without his support the project folded. Although they continued to visit each other until Degas's death in 1917, she never again worked with him as closely as she had over the prints journal.

Around 1884, Degas made a portrait in oils of Cassatt, Mary Cassatt Seated, Holding Cards. Stephanie Strasnick suggests that the cards are probably cartes de visite, used by artists and dealers at the time to document their work. Cassatt thought it represented her as "a repugnant person" and later sold it, writing to her dealer Paul Durand-Ruel in 1912 or 1913 that "I would not want it known that I posed for it."

Degas was forthright in his views, as was Cassatt. They clashed over the Dreyfus affair. (Note: Pro-Dreyfus included Camille Pissarro, Claude Monet, Paul Signac and Mary Cassatt. Anti-Dreyfus included Edgar Degas, Paul Cézanne, Auguste Rodin and Pierre-Auguste Renoir.) Cassatt later expressed satisfaction at the irony of Louisine Havemeyer's 1915 joint exhibition of Cassatt's and Degas's work being held in aid of women's suffrage.

In 2014, the National Gallery of Art examined their long friendship in its exhibit Degas/Cassatt. The catalog was written by Kimberly Jones ISBN 978-3791353647

== Relationship with Suzanne Valadon ==
Degas was a friend and admirer of Suzanne Valadon. He was one of the first people to purchase her art, and he taught her soft-ground etching.

He wrote her several letters, most asking her to come see him with her drawings. For example, in an undated letter he said in response to one of her letters to him (translated from French):

Every year I see this handwriting, drawn like a saw, arriving, terrible Maria. But I never see the author arrive with a box (of drawings) under her arm. And yet I am getting very old. Happy new year.

R. W. Meek's historical fiction novel, The Dream Collector: Sabrine & Sigmund Freud, imagines Edgar Degas's friendship with Suzanne Valadon.

== Legacy with Édouard Manet ==
In 2023, The Metropolitan Museum of Art in New York exhibited a two-person exhibition of Degas and Manet.

== Gallery ==
=== Paintings ===
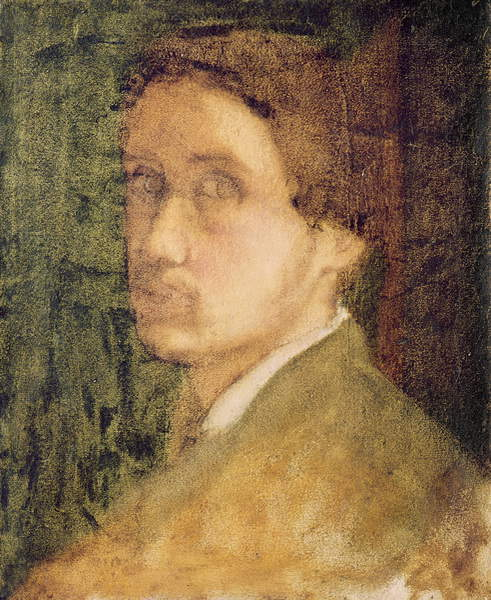
Degas - Self Portrait, c.1852

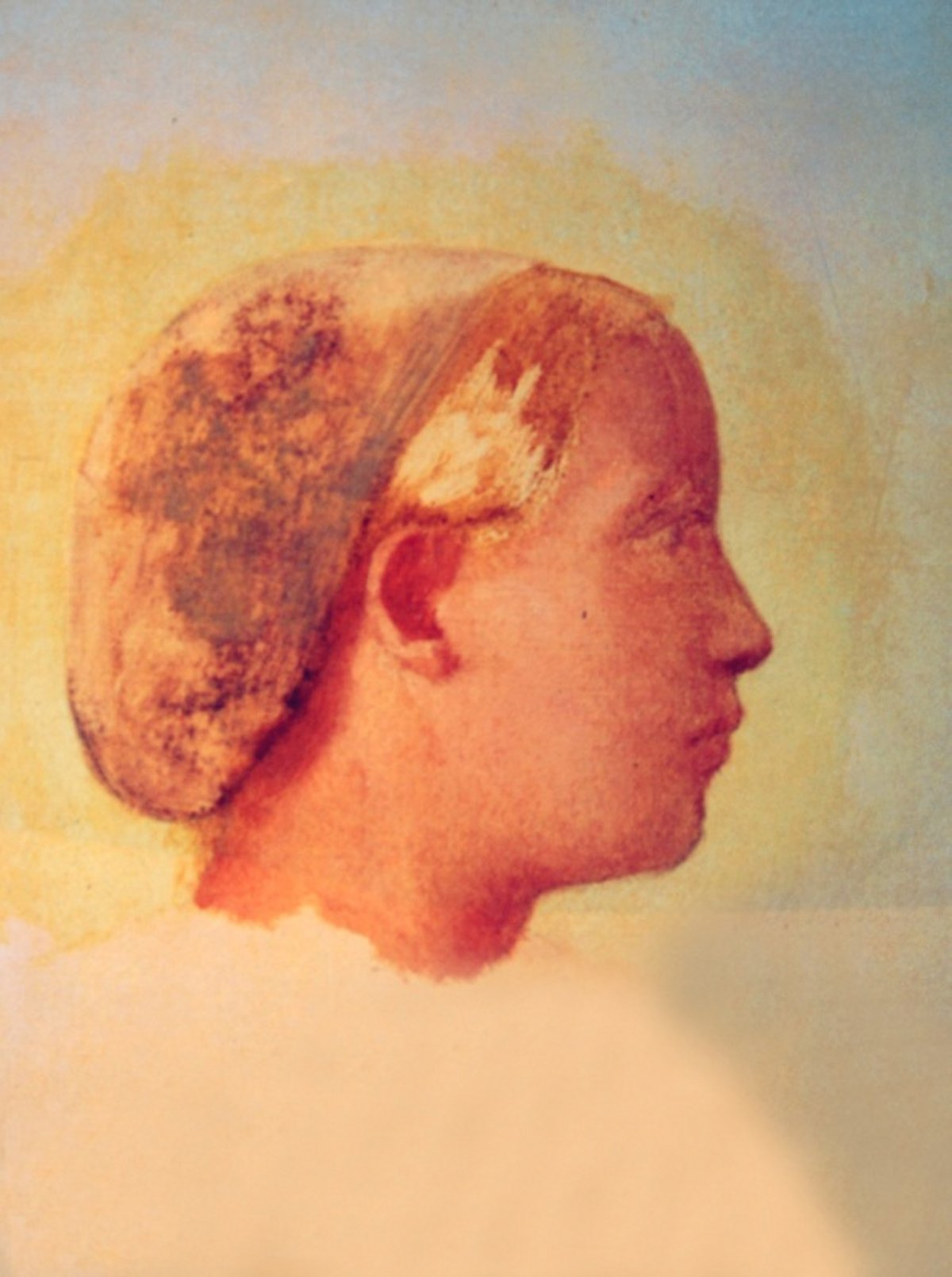
Marguerite de Gas 1853

Achille De Gas in the Uniform of a Cadet, 1856/57, National Gallery of Art, Washington, D.C.

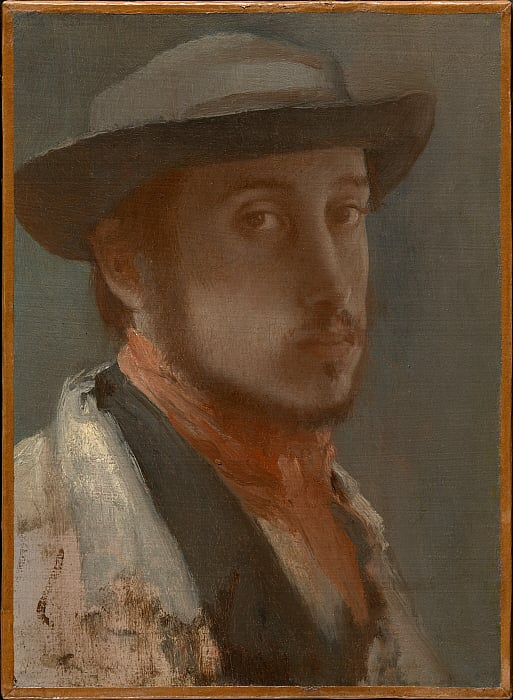
Self-Portrait (1857–58), oil on paper, mounted on canvas, 10 1/4 x 7 1/2 in. (26 x 19.1 cm), Clark Art Institute

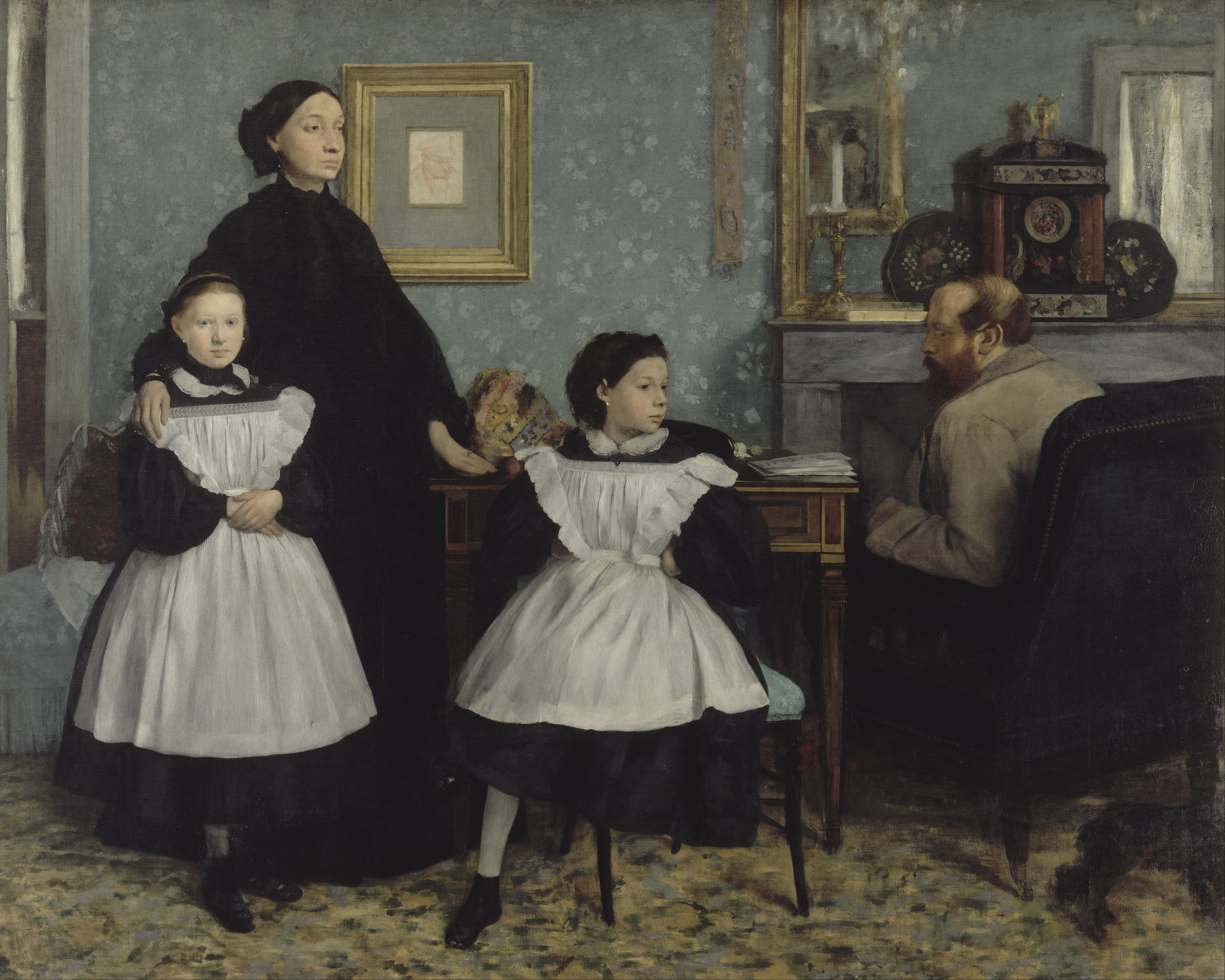
The Bellelli Family, 1858–1867, Musée d'Orsay, Paris

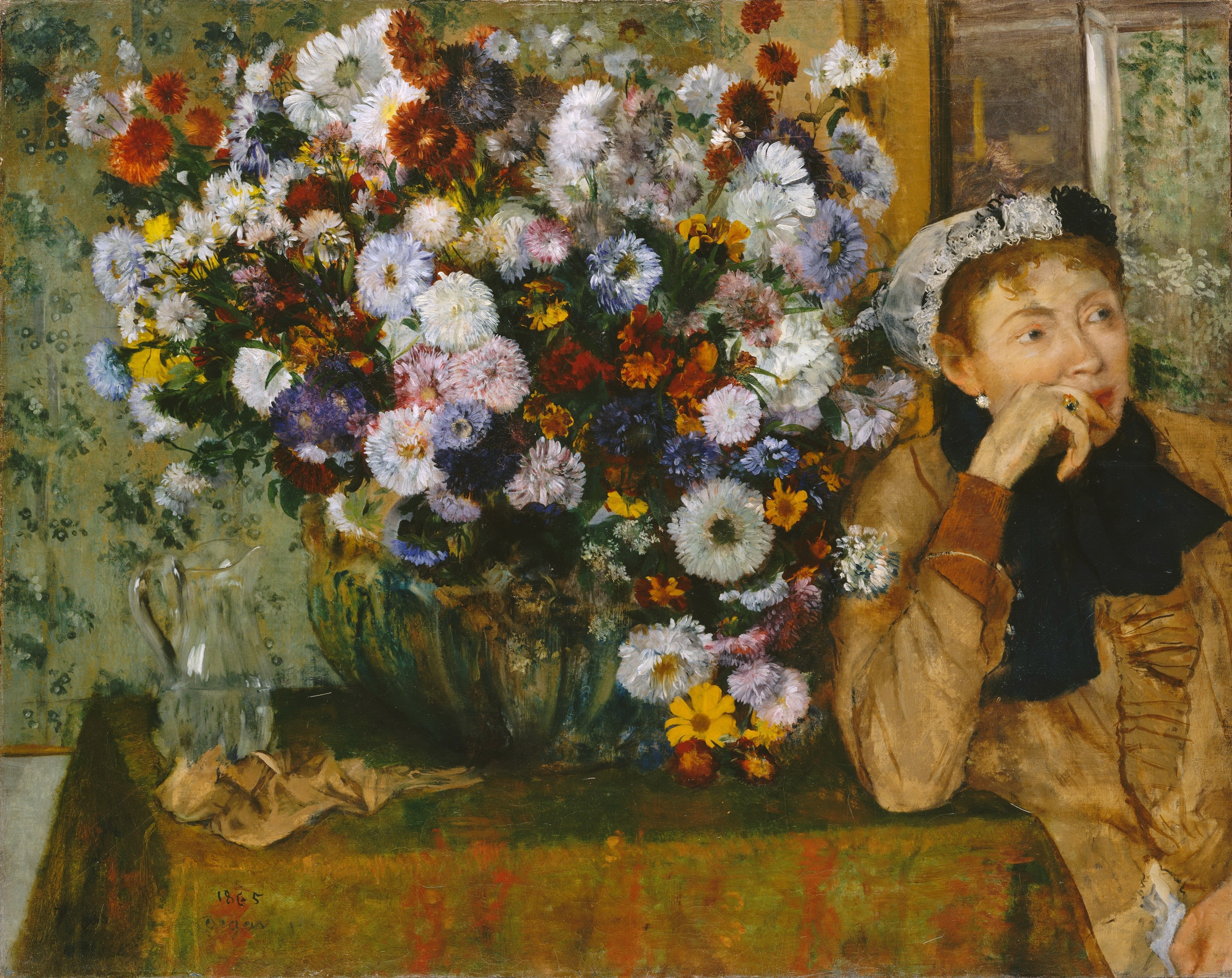
Woman Seated beside a Vase of Flowers, 1865, oil on canvas, Metropolitan Museum of Art, New York City

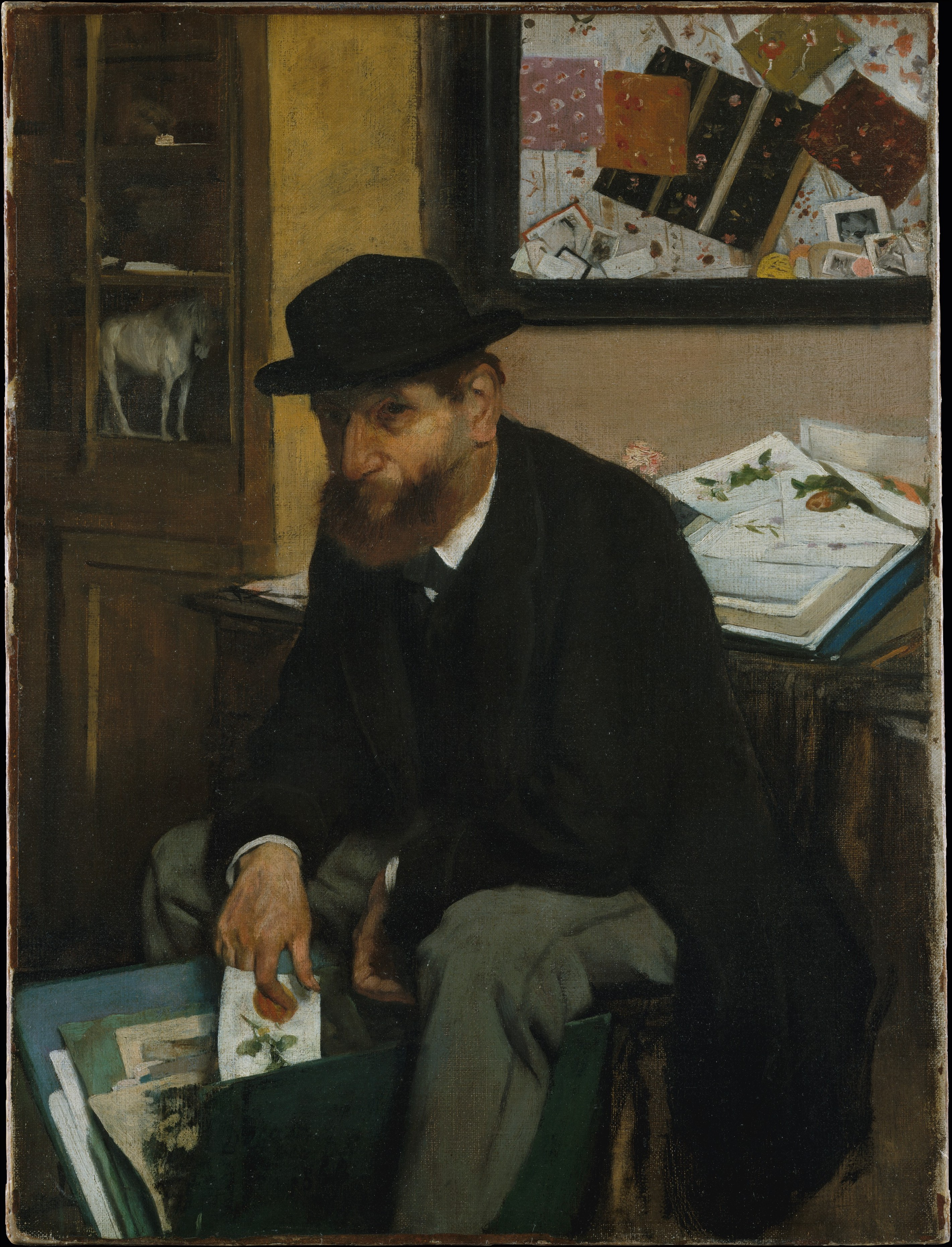
The Collector of Prints, 1866, The Metropolitan Museum of Art, New York City

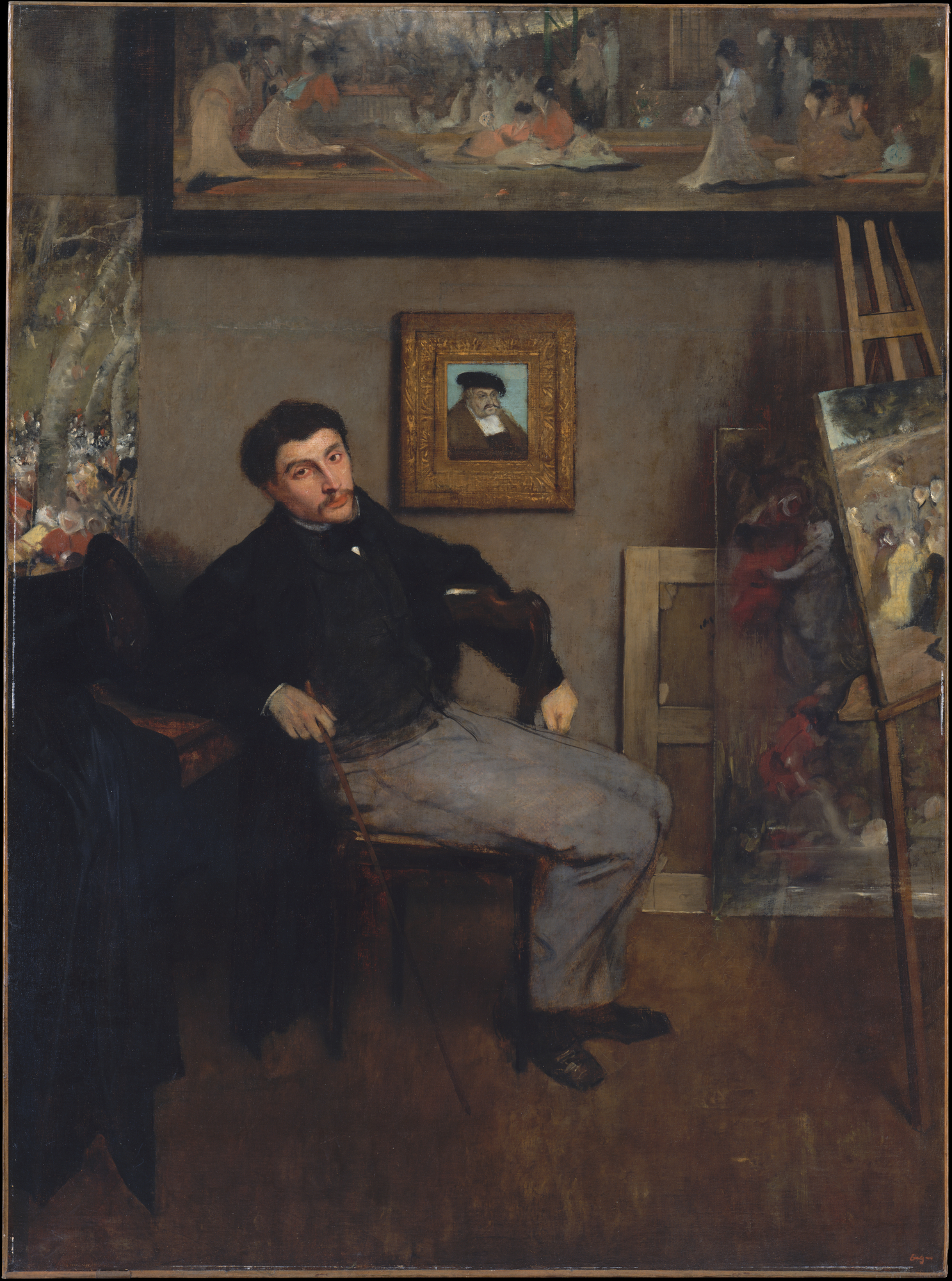
James-Jacques-Joseph Tissot (1836–1902), 1867, Metropolitan Museum of Art, New York City

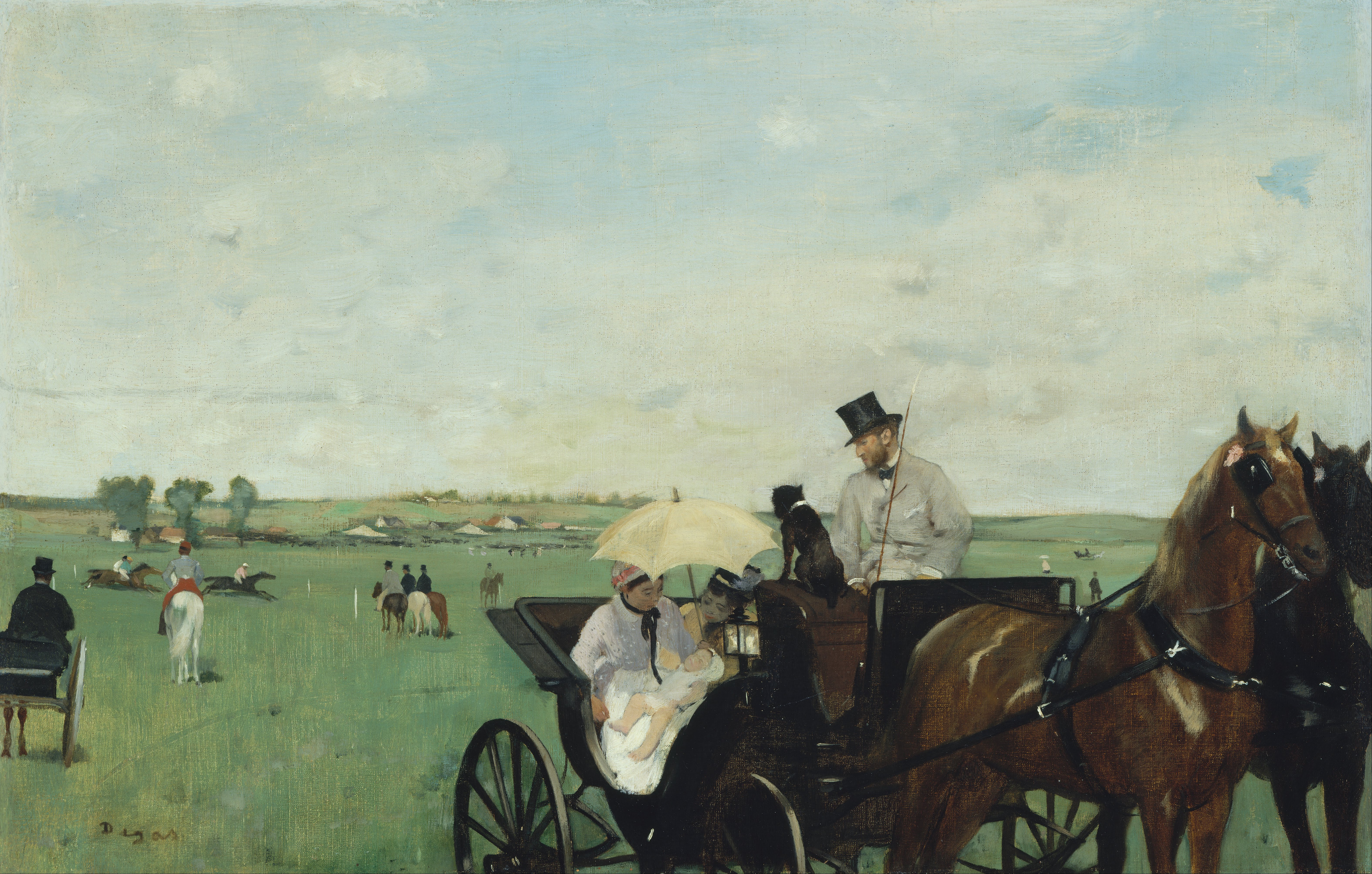
At the Races in the Countryside, 1869, Museum of Fine Arts, Boston

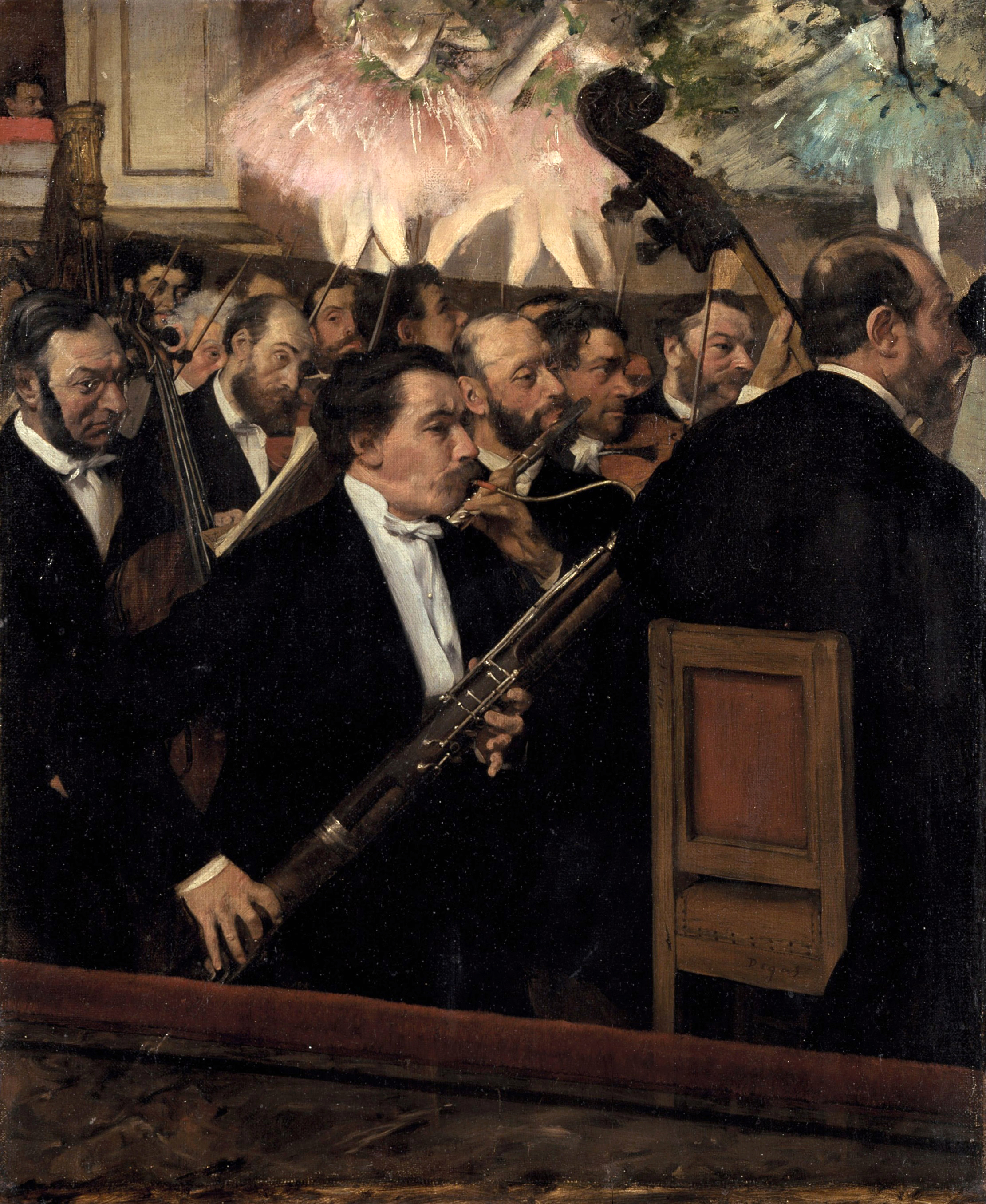
The Orchestra at the Opera, 1870, Musée d'Orsay, Paris

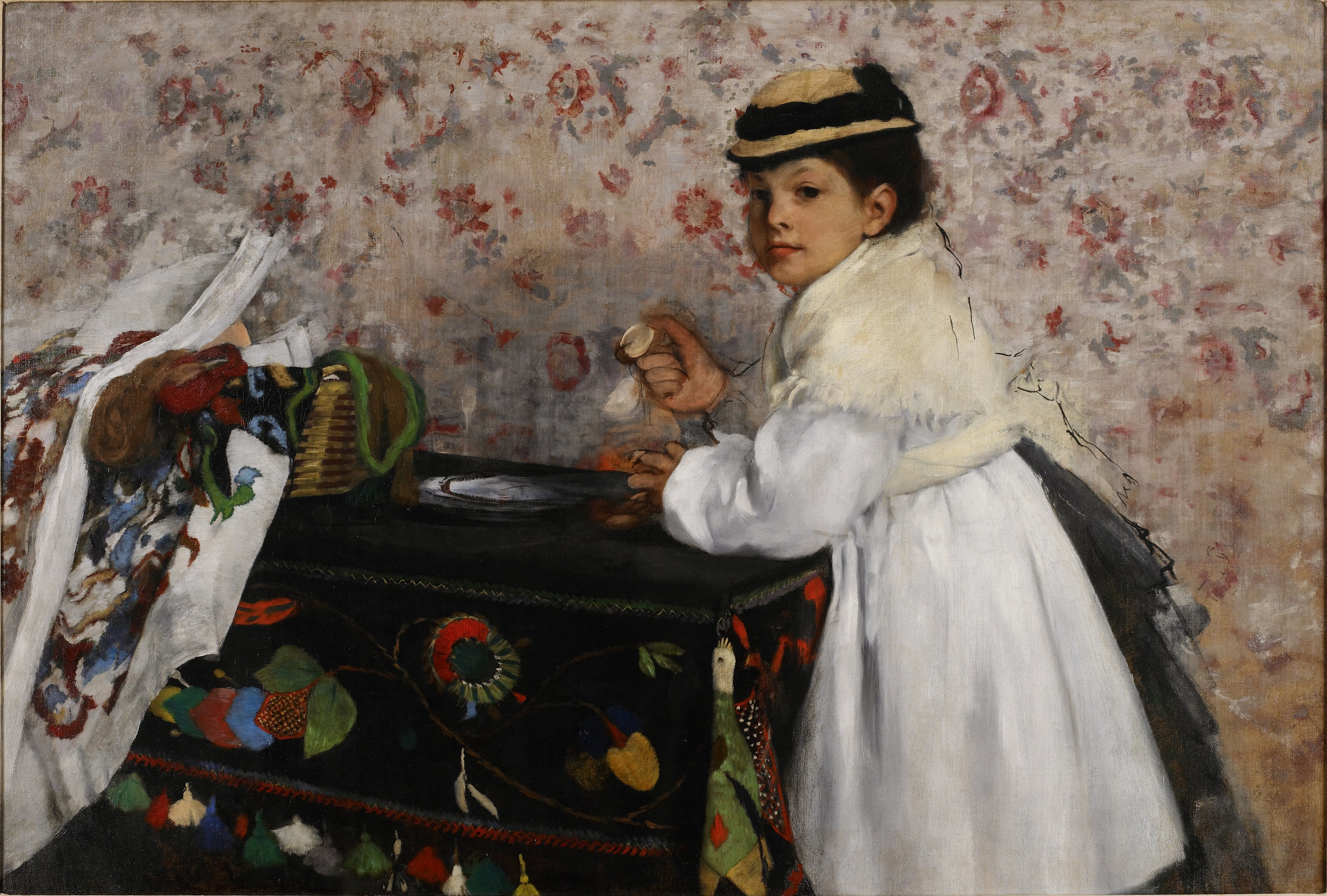
Portrait of Mlle. Hortense Valpinçon, c. 1871, Minneapolis Institute of Art

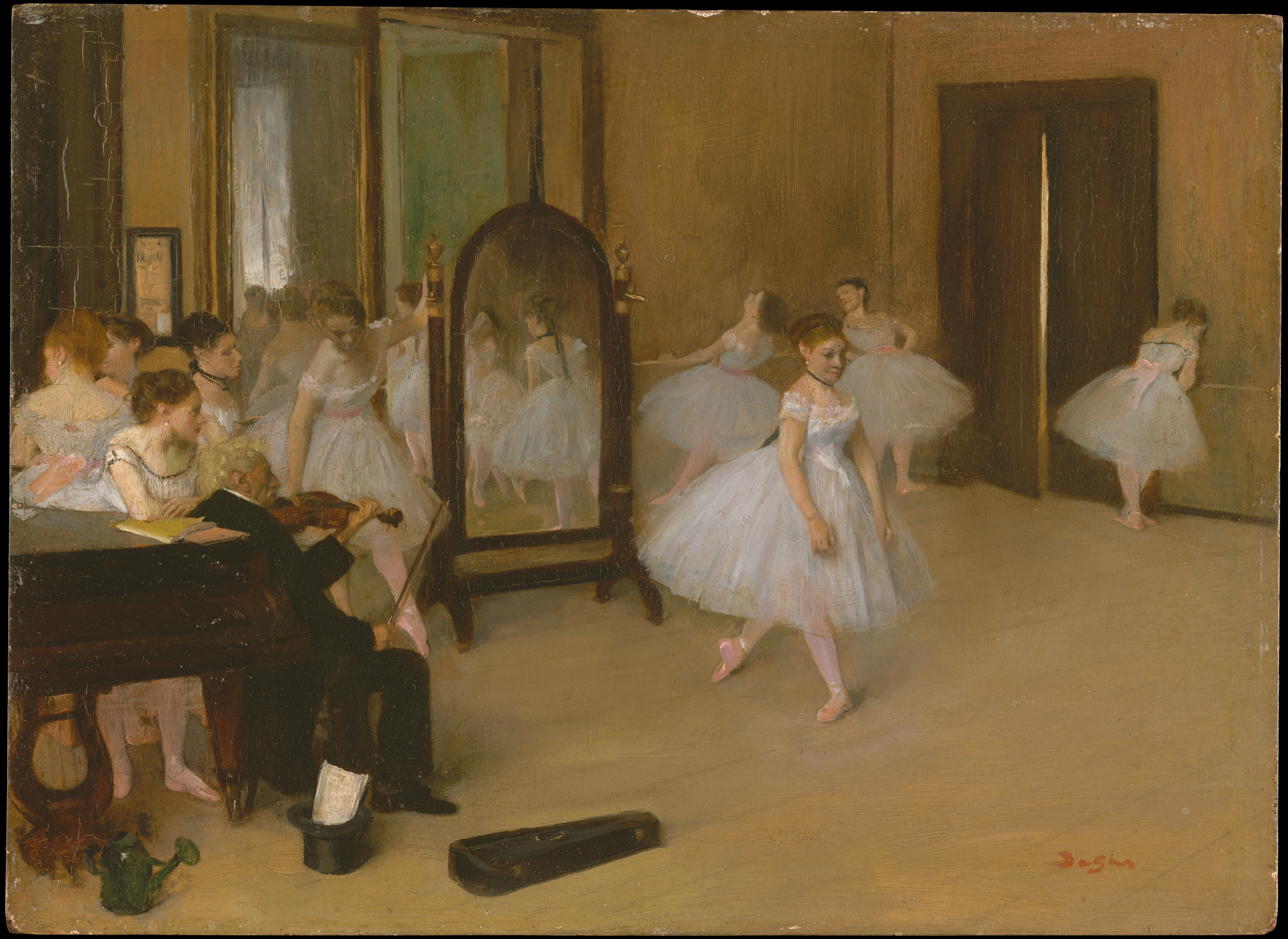
The Dancing Class, 1871, The Metropolitan Museum of Art, New York City

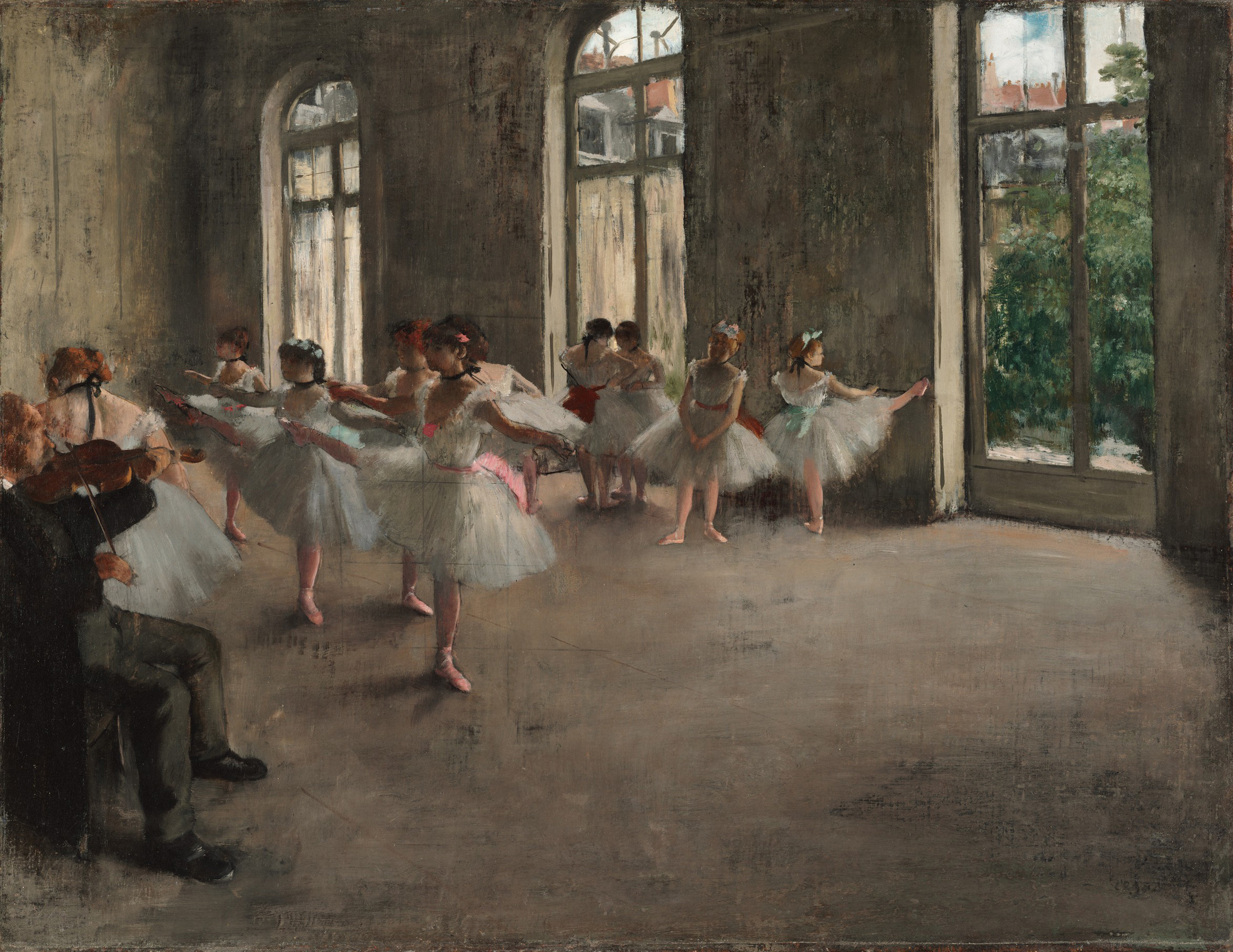
Ballet Rehearsal, 1873, The Fogg Art Museum, Cambridge, Massachusetts

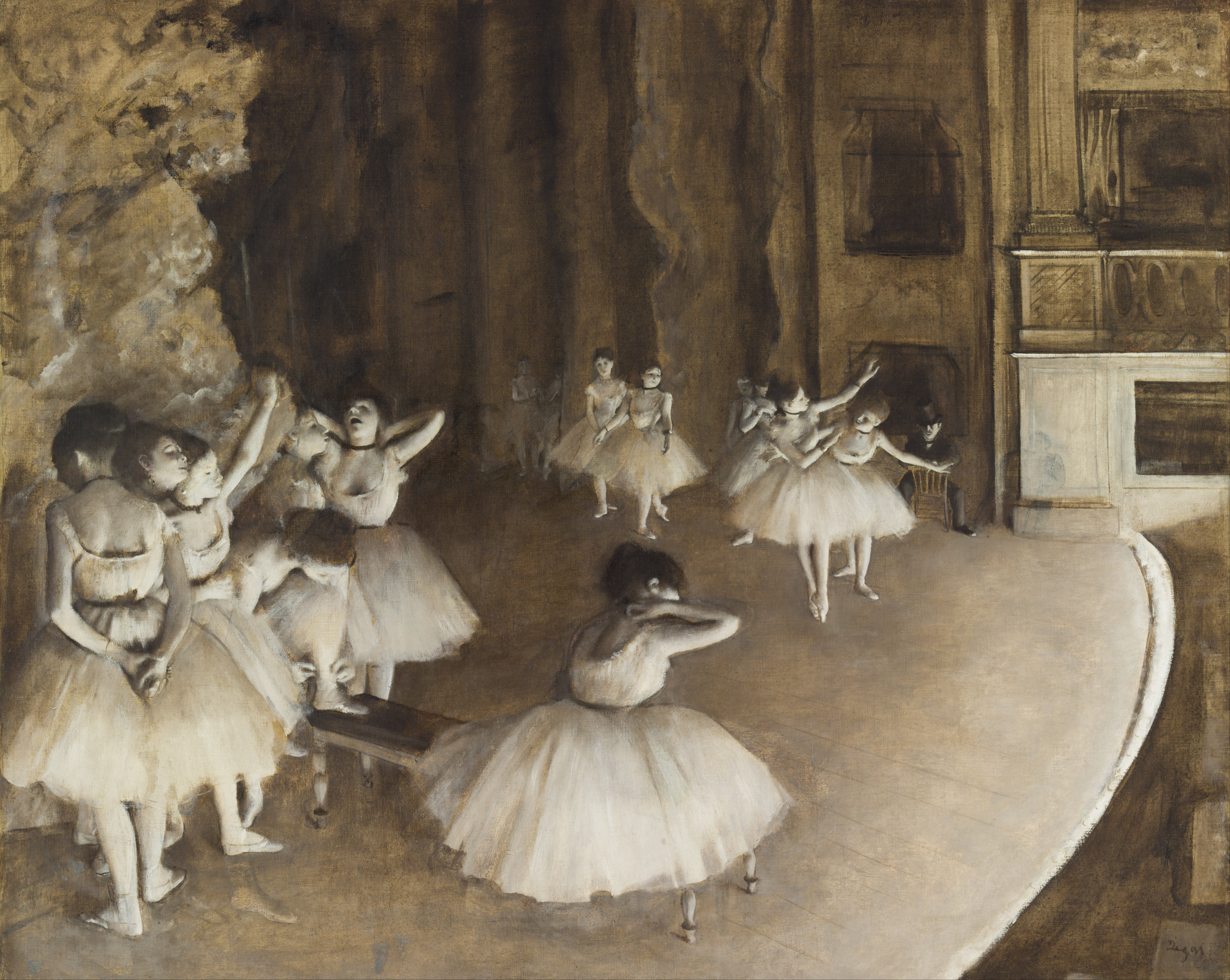
Rehearsal on Stage, 1874, Musée d'Orsay, Paris

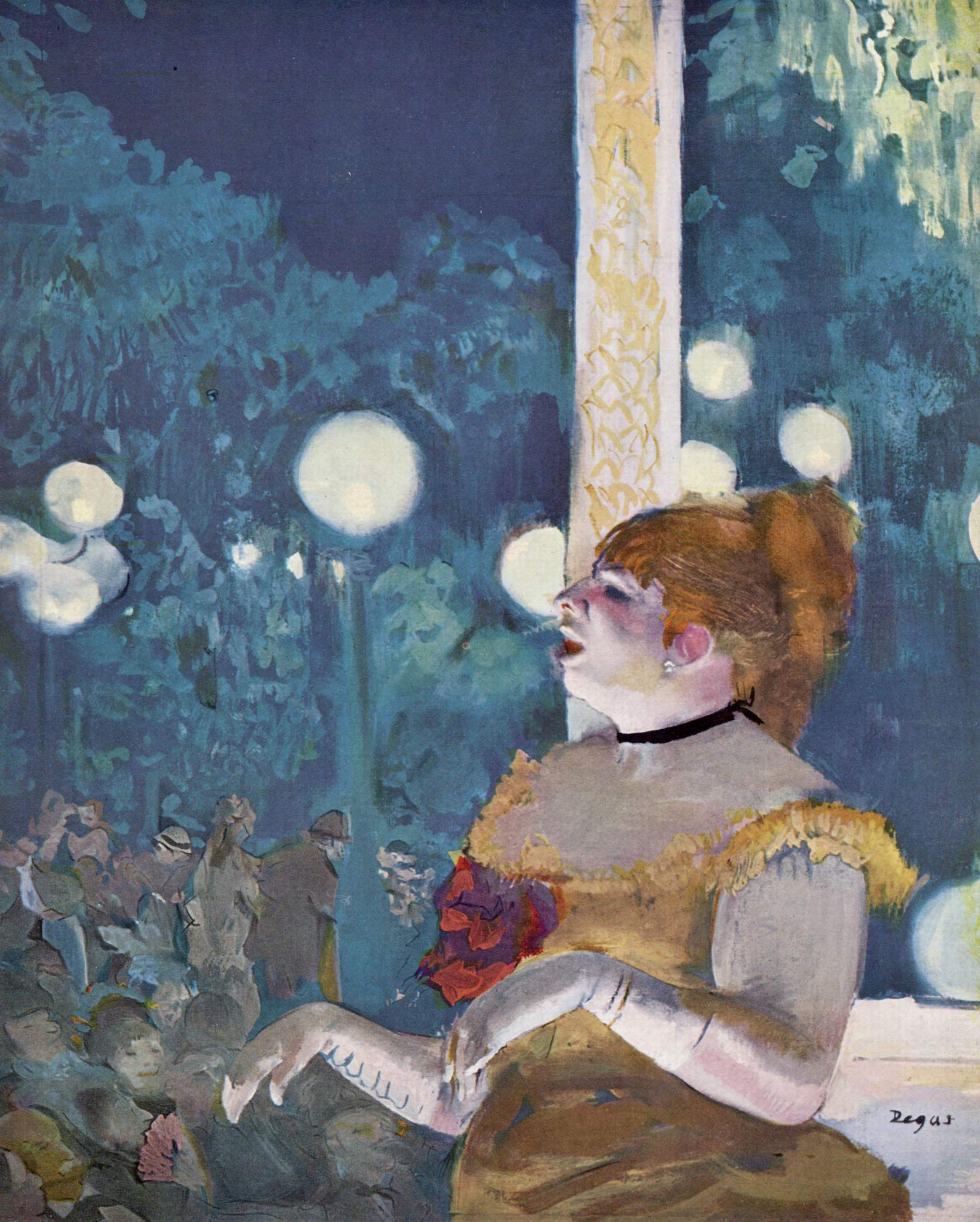
At the Café-Concert: The Song of the Dog, 1875–1877, Private collection

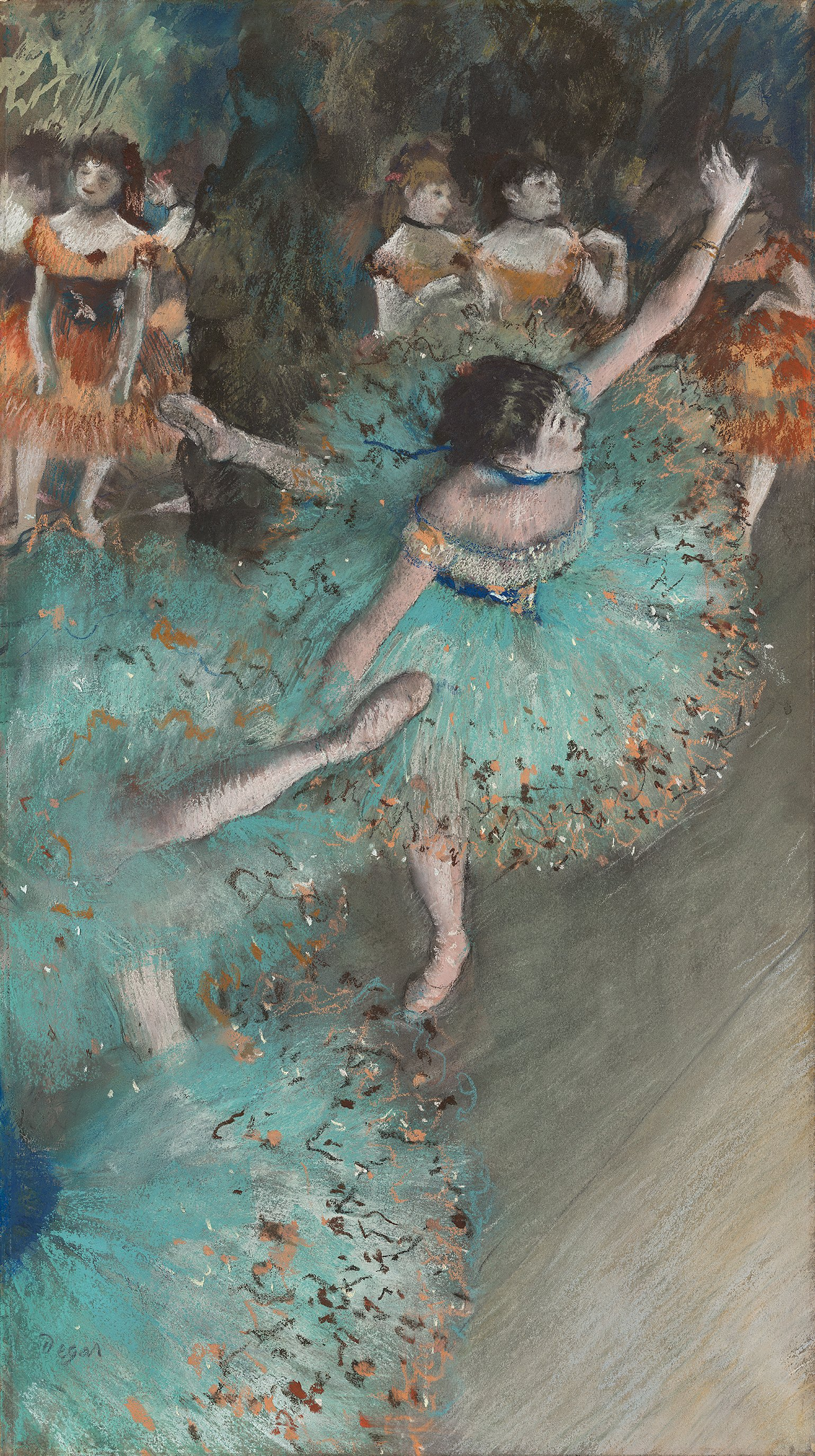
Swaying Dancer (Dancer in Green), 1877–1879, Thyssen-Bornemisza Museum, Madrid

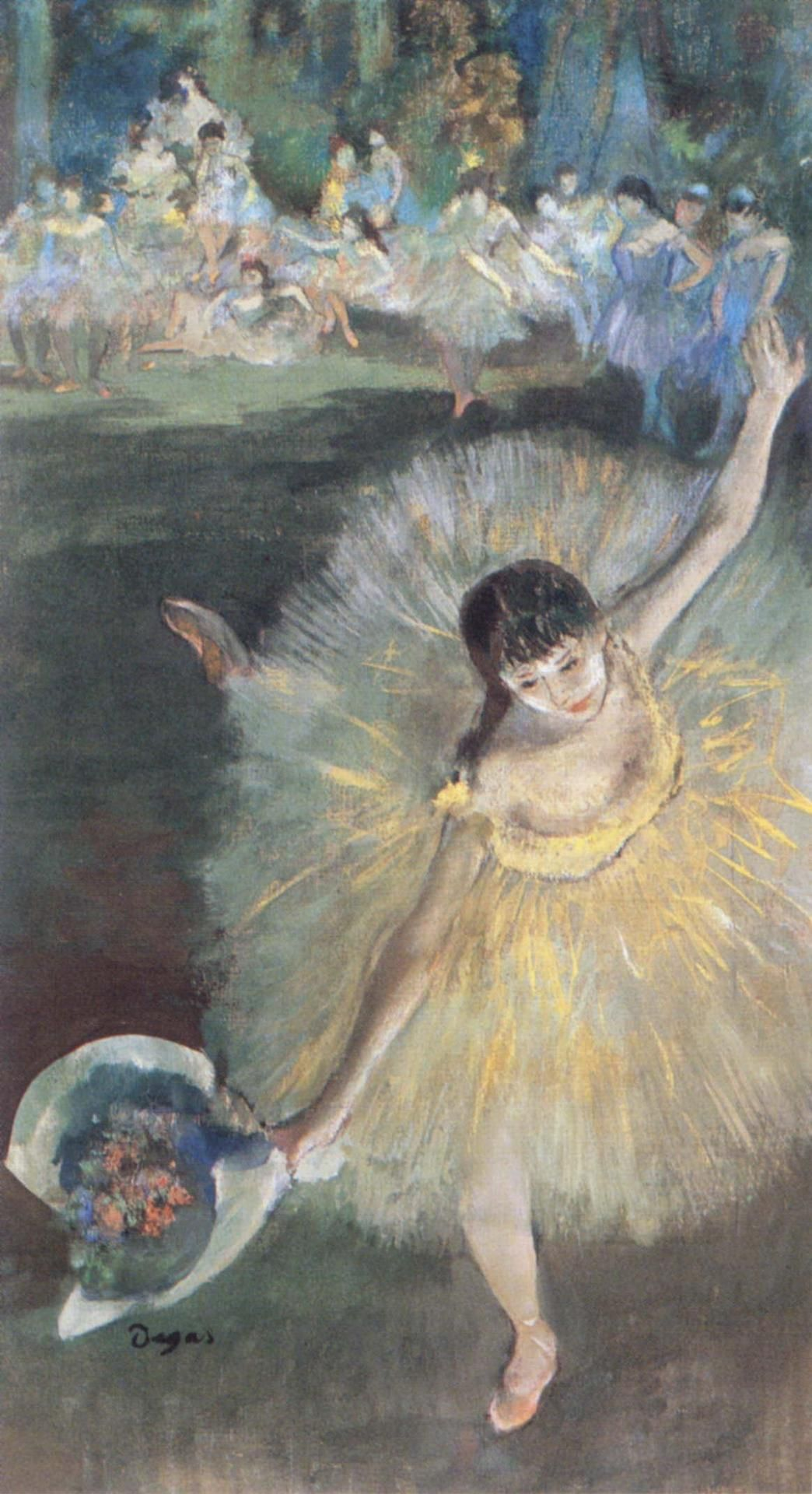
Fin d'Arabesque, with ballerina Rosita Mauri, 1877, Musée d'Orsay, Paris

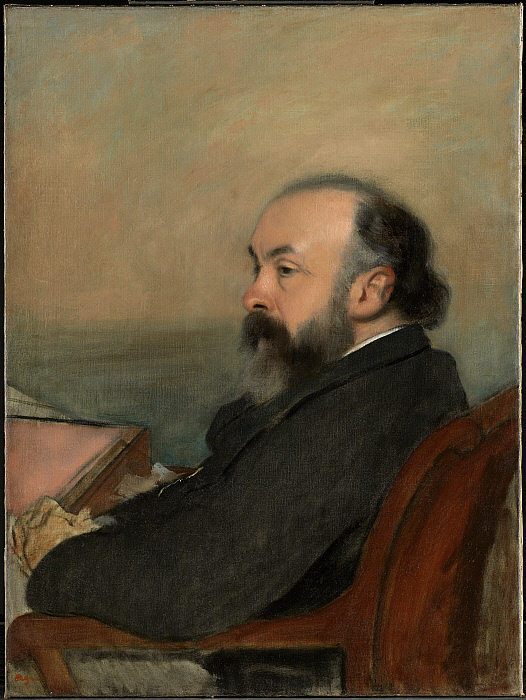
Portrait of a Man (1877), oil on canvas, 31 1/8 x 23 1/4 in. (79 x 59 cm), Clark Art Institute

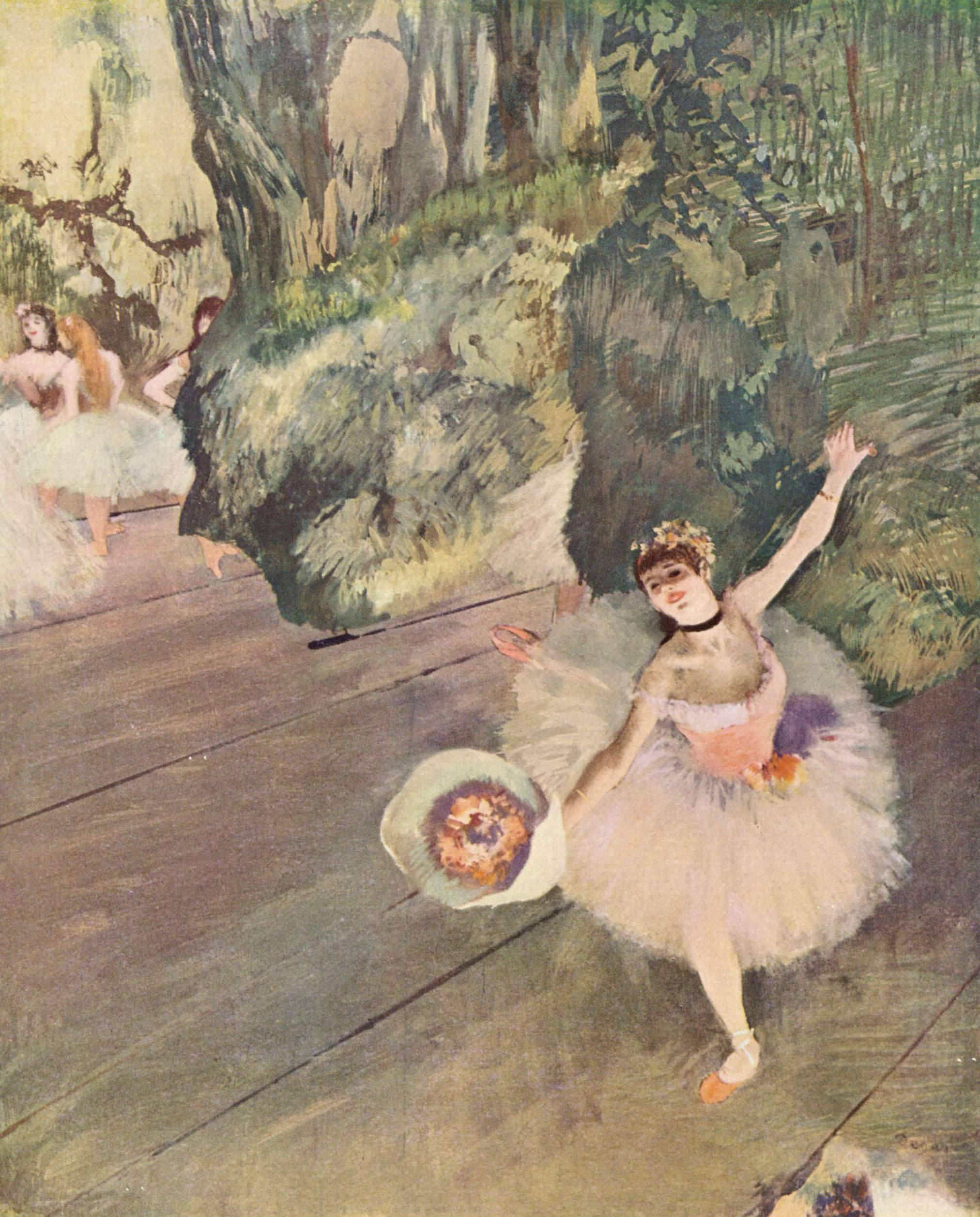
Dancer with a Bouquet of Flowers (Star of the Ballet) (also with ballerina Rosita Mauri), 1878

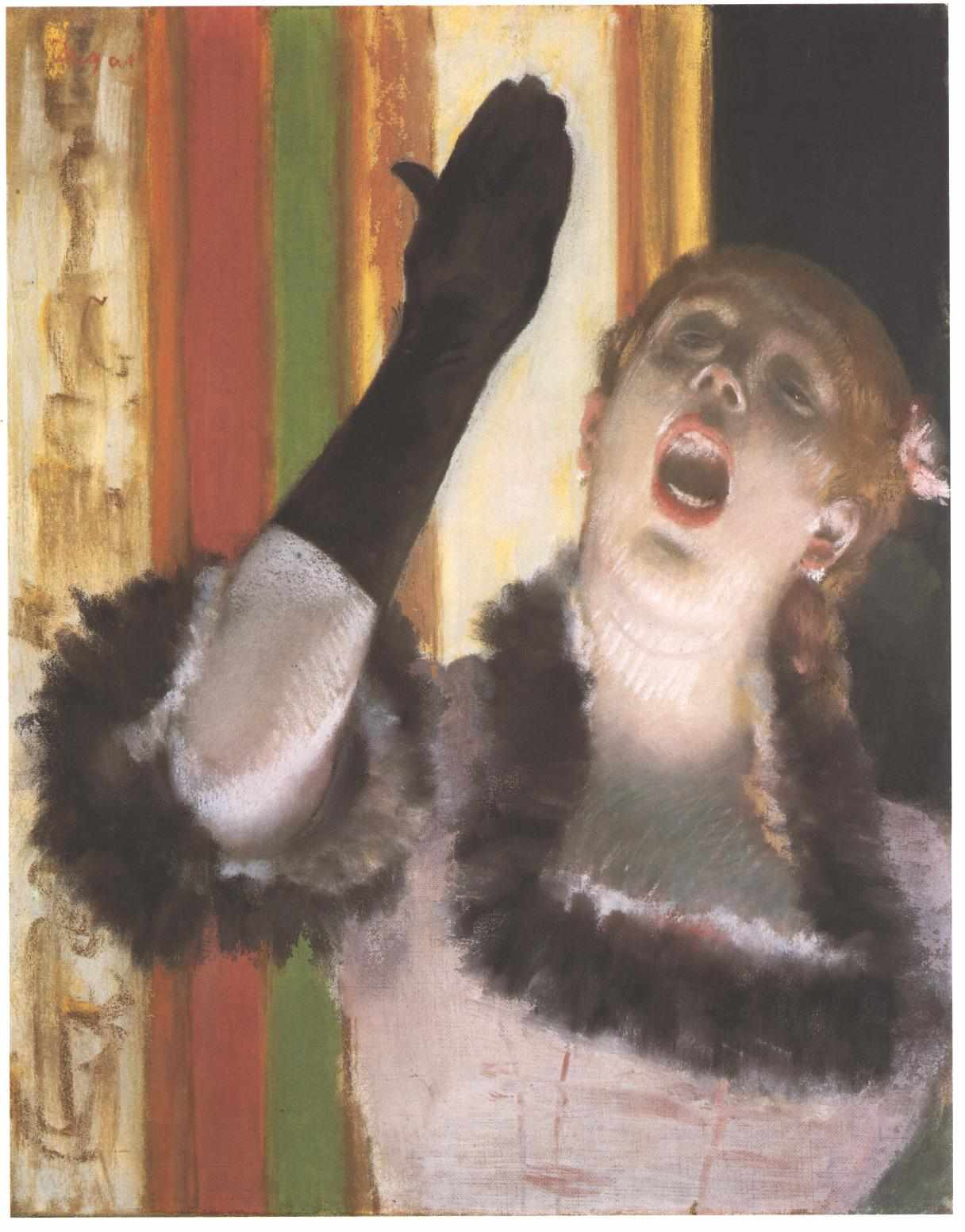
The Singer with the Glove, 1878, The Fogg Art Museum, Cambridge, Massachusetts

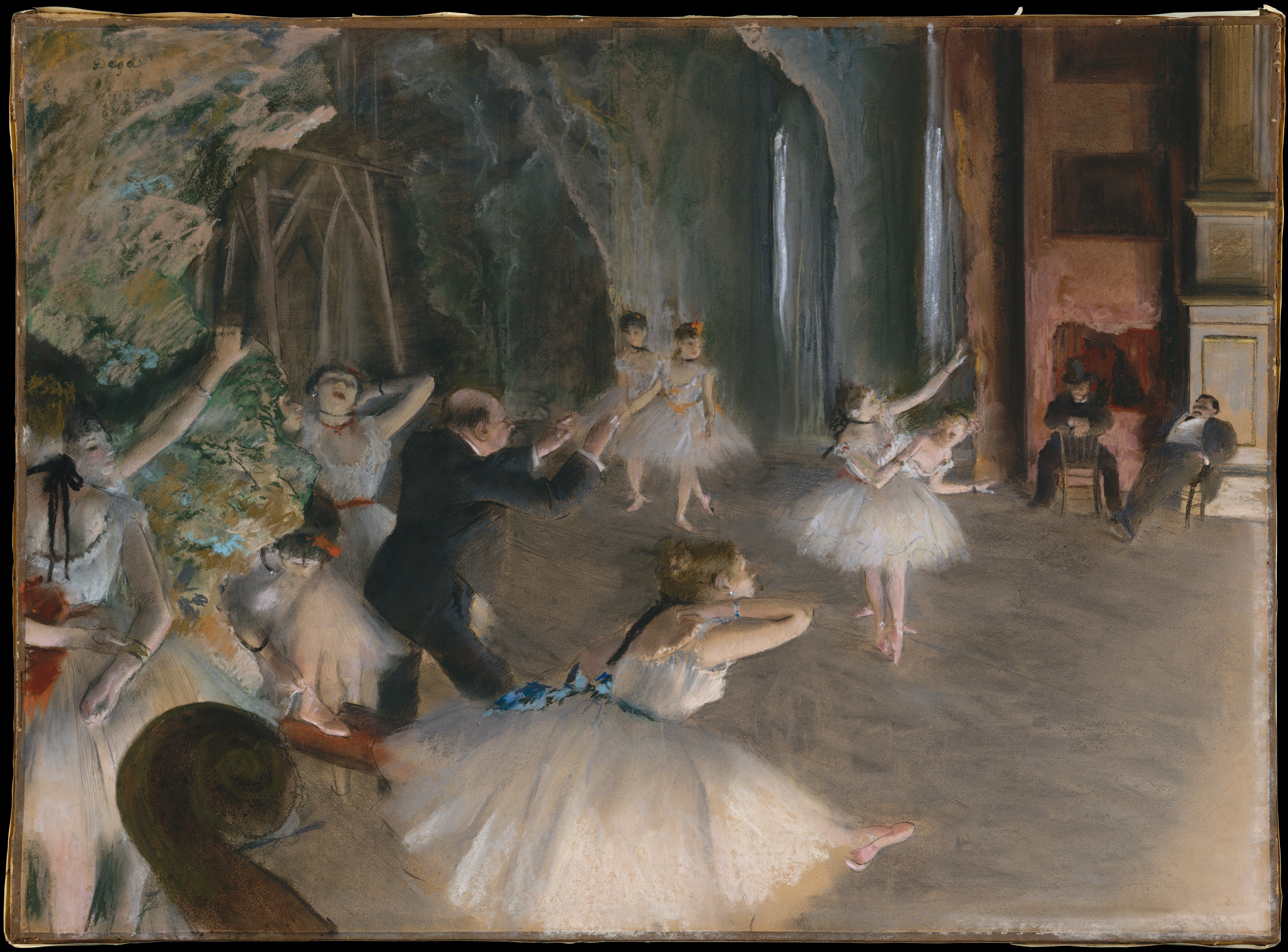
Stage Rehearsal, 1878–1879, The Metropolitan Museum of Art, New York City

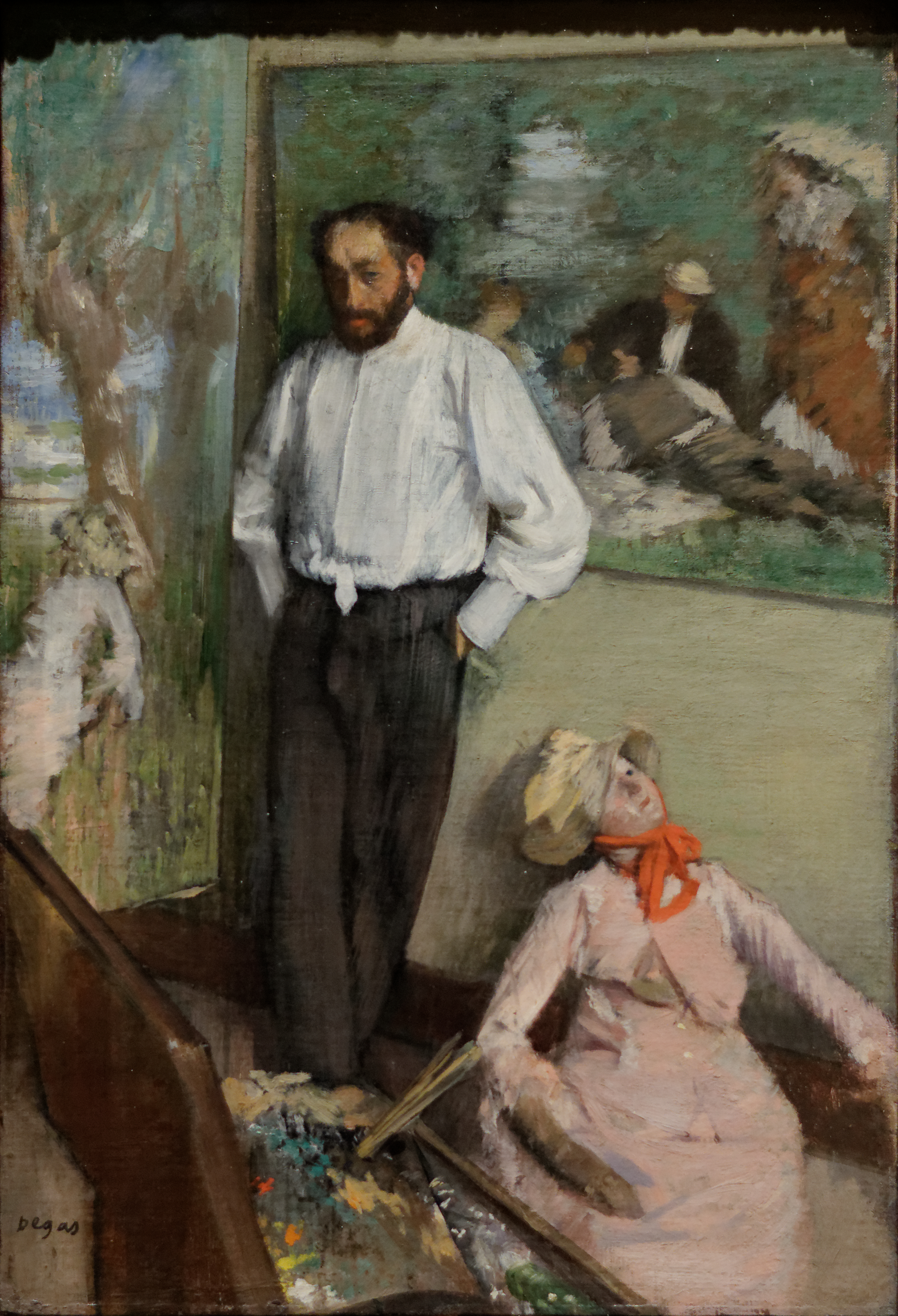
Portrait of Henri Michel-Lévy, 1878, Calouste Gulbenkian Museum

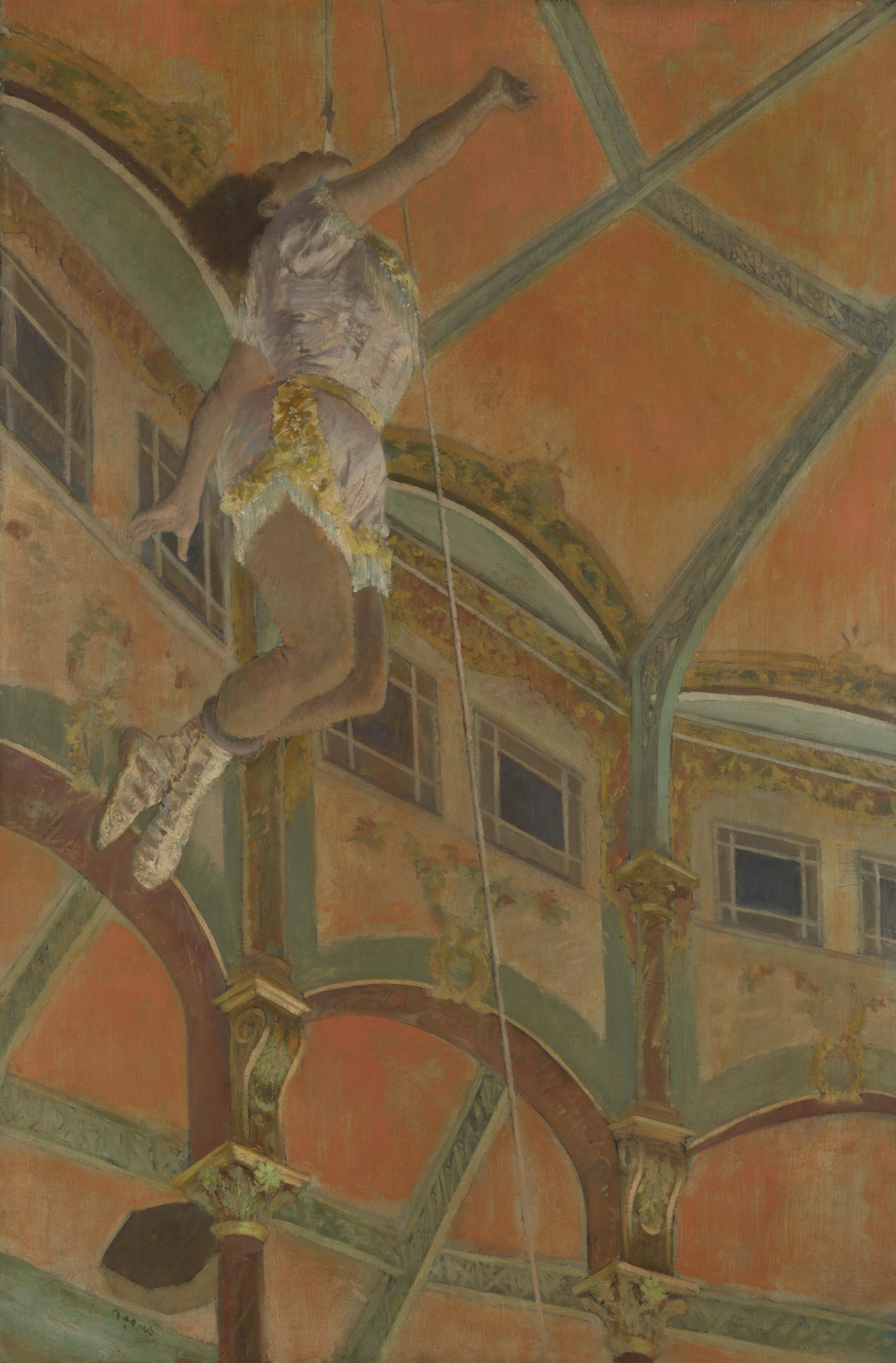
Miss La La at the Cirque Fernando, 1879, The National Gallery, London

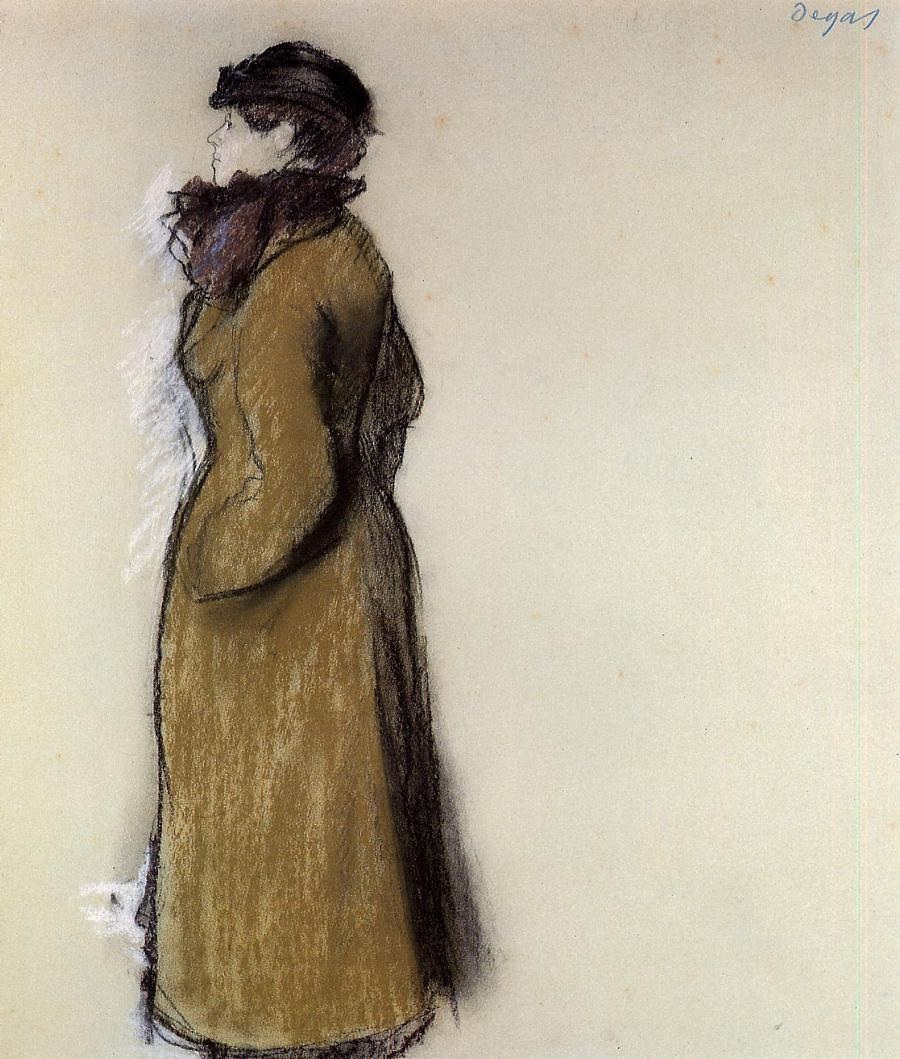
Woman in Street Clothes, Portrait of Ellen Andrée, 1879, pastel on paper

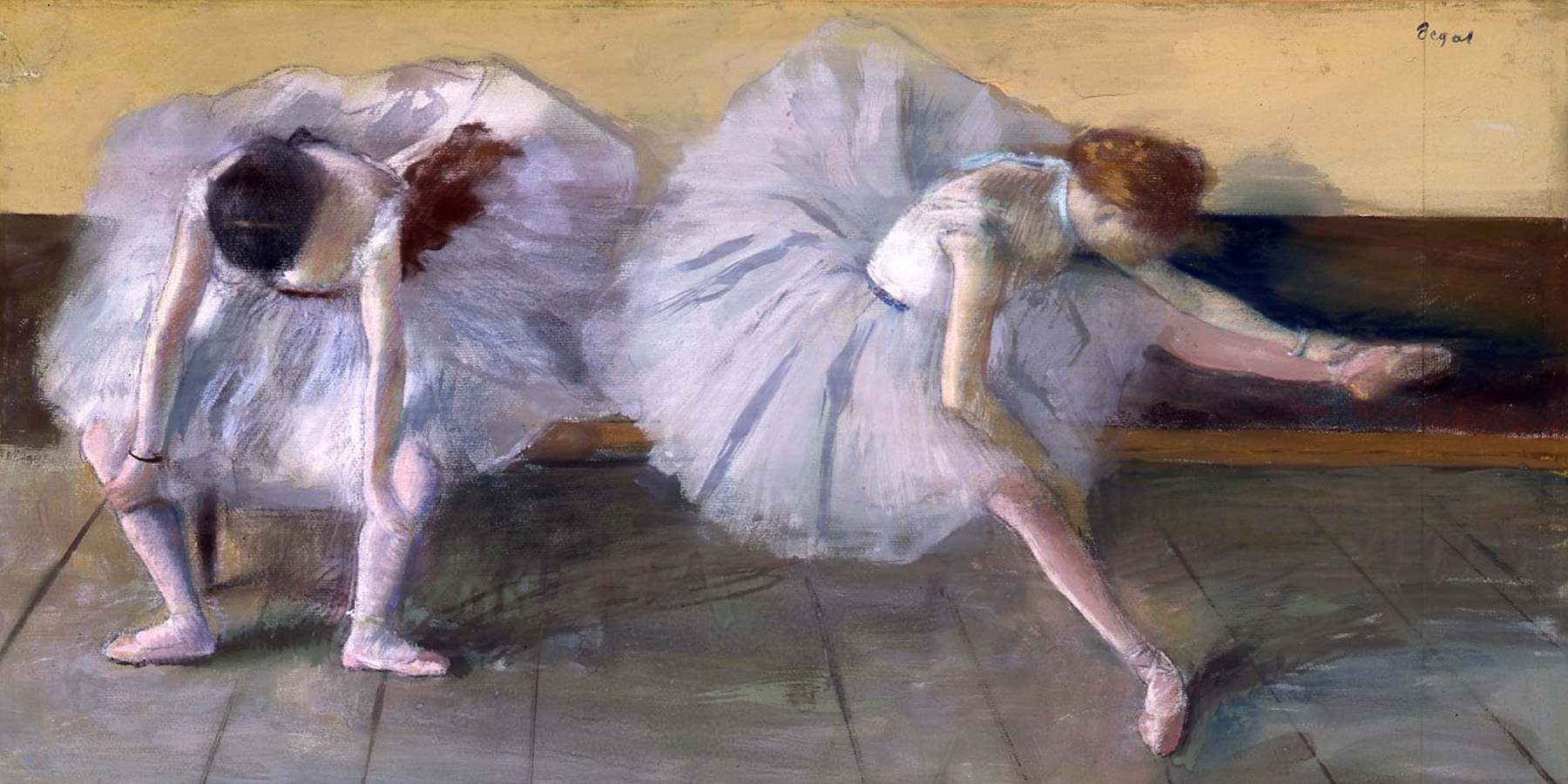
Deux danseuses, 1879 at the Shelburne Museum

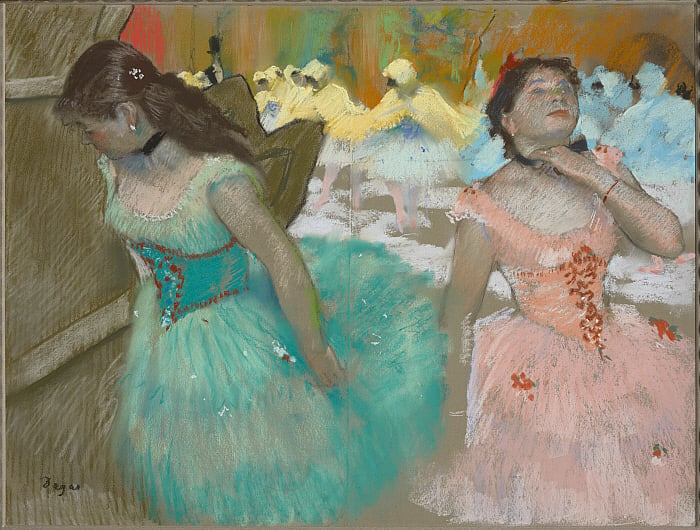
Entrance of the Masked Dancers (1879), pastel on gray wove paper, 19 5/16 x 25 1/2 in. (49 x 64.8 cm), Clark Art Institute

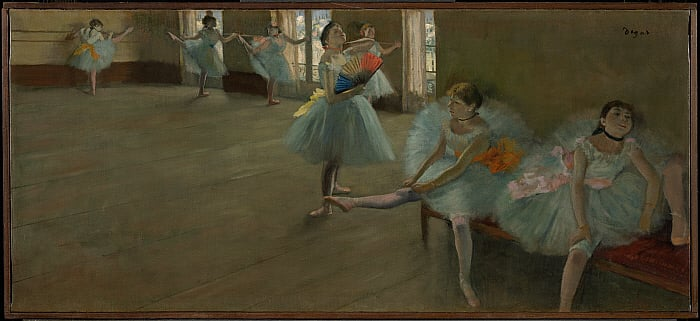
Dancers in the Classroom (1880), oil on canvas, 15 1/2 x 34 13/16 in. (39.4 x 88.4 cm), Clark Art Institute

Waiting, pastel on paper, 1880–1882

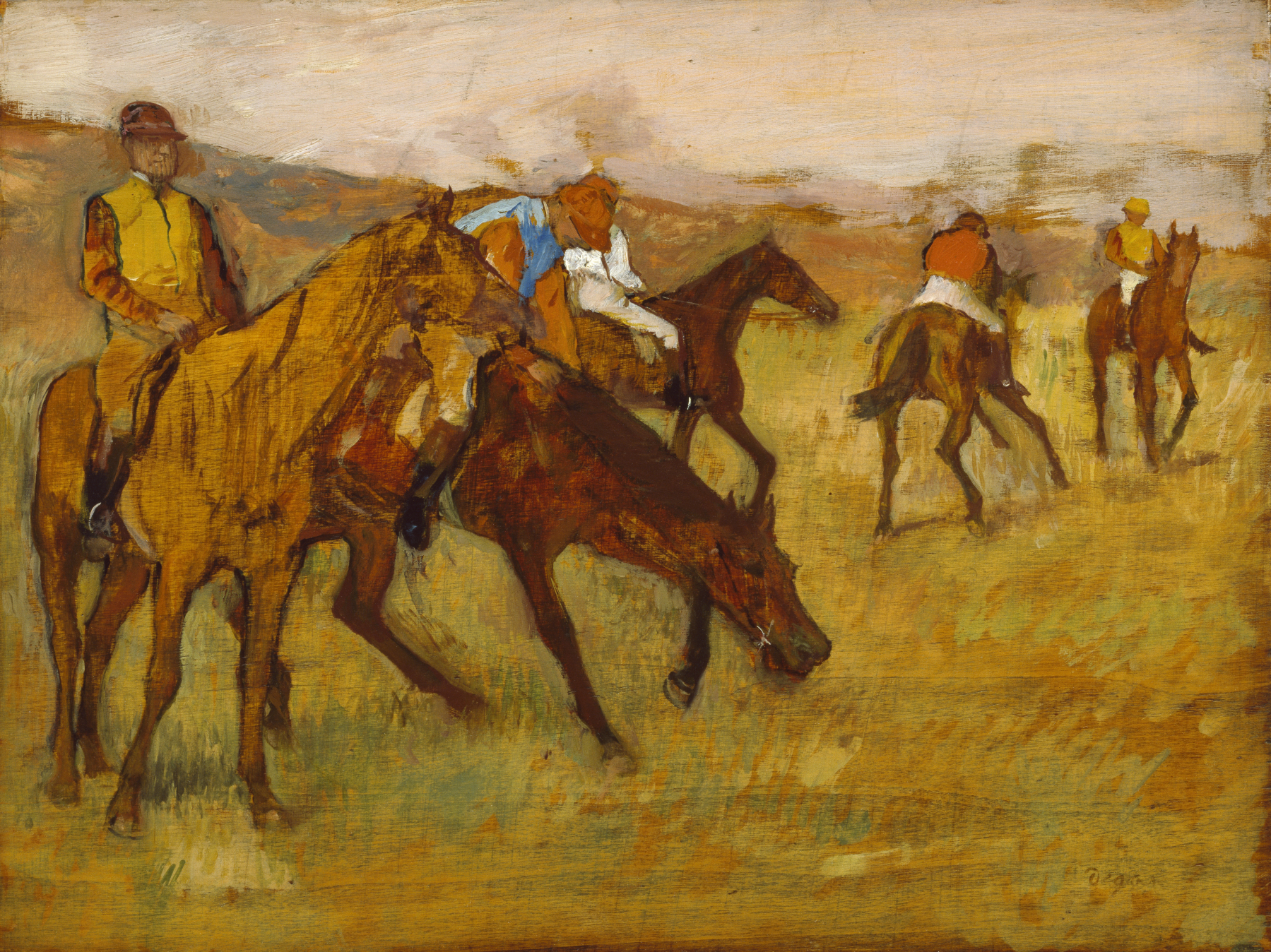
Before the Race, 1882–1884, oil on panel, The Walters Art Museum, Baltimore

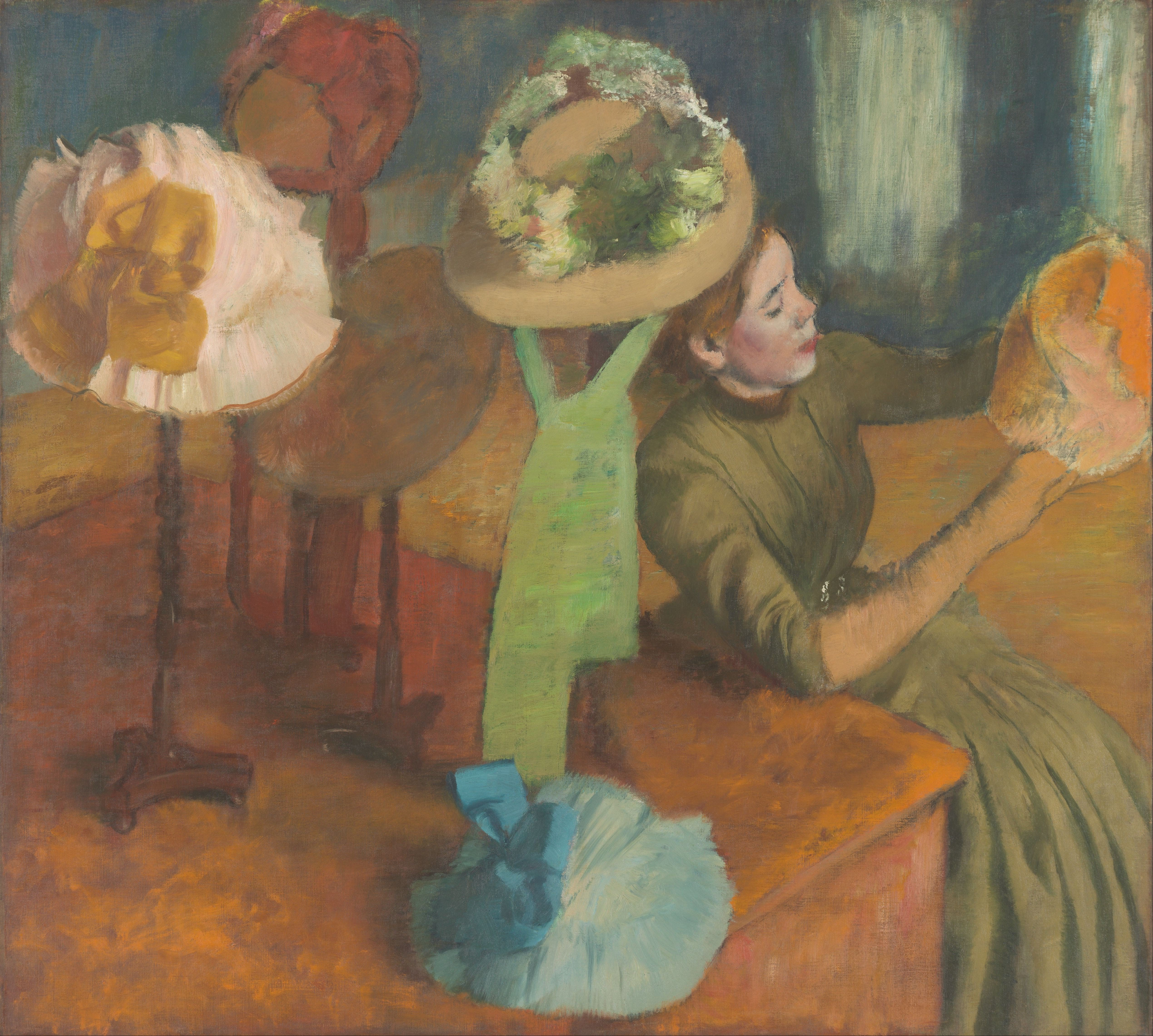
The Millinery Shop, 1885, The Art Institute of Chicago

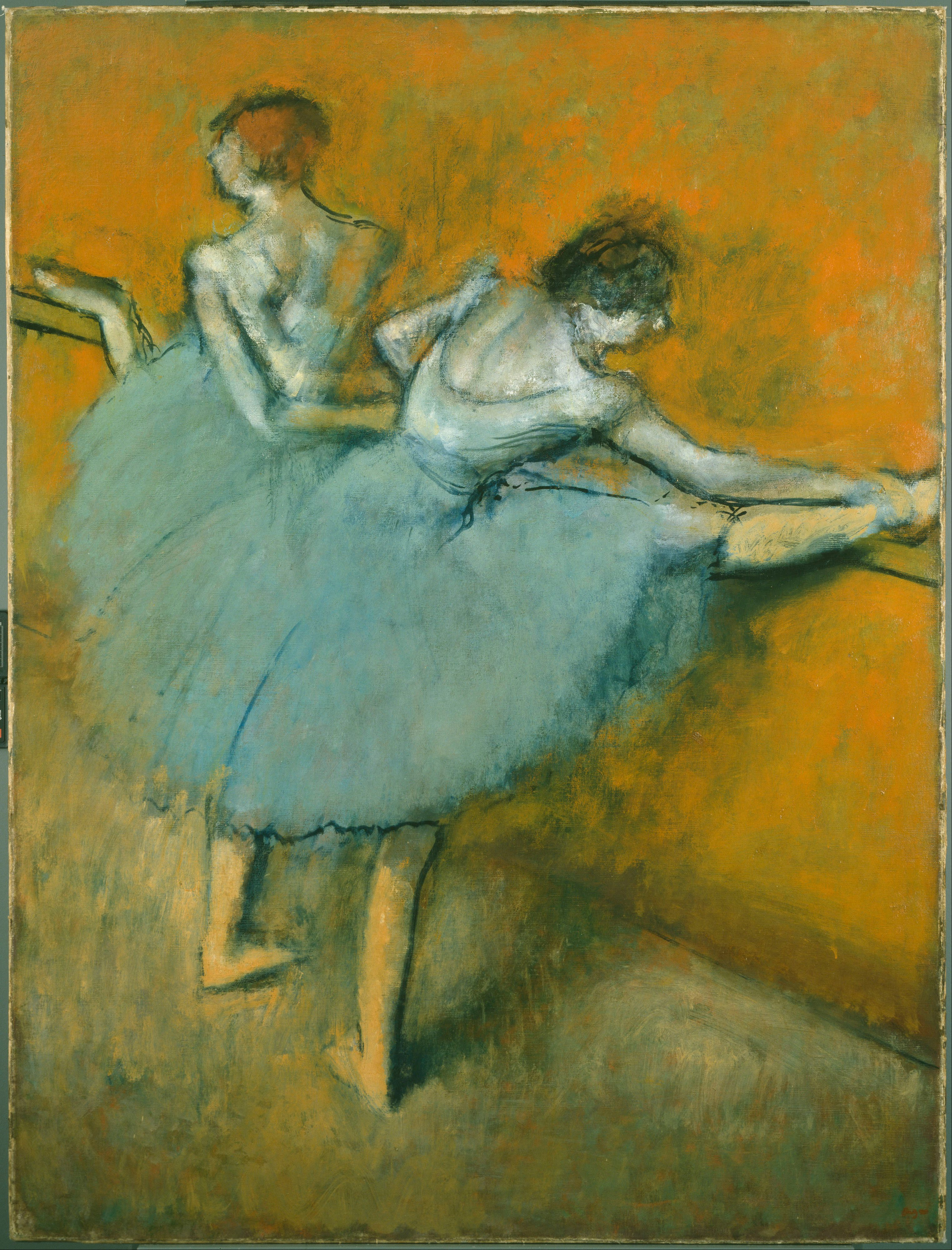
Dancers at the Bar, 1888, The Phillips Collection, Washington, D.C.

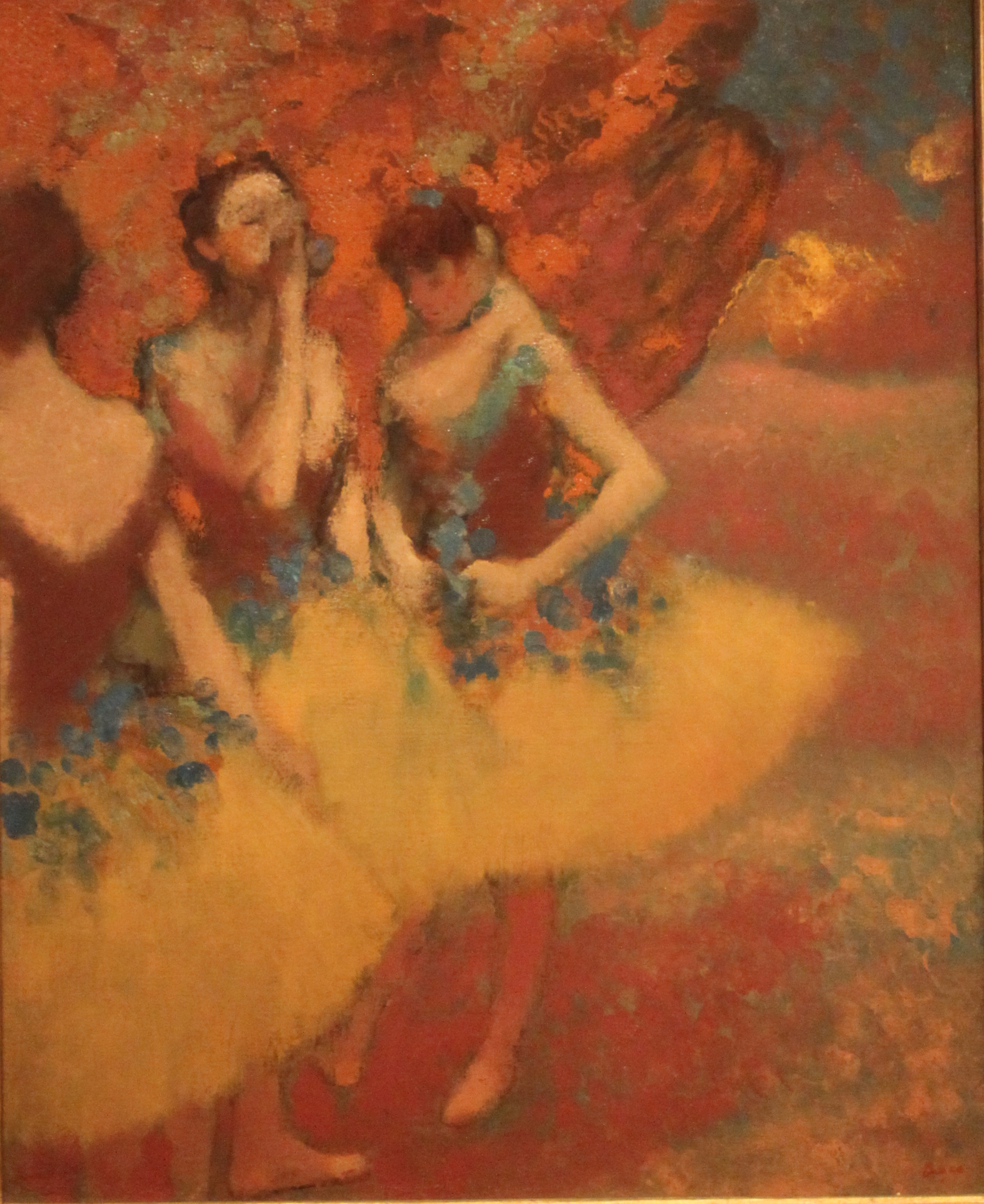
Three Dancers in Yellow Skirts, c. 1891, The Detroit Institute of Arts

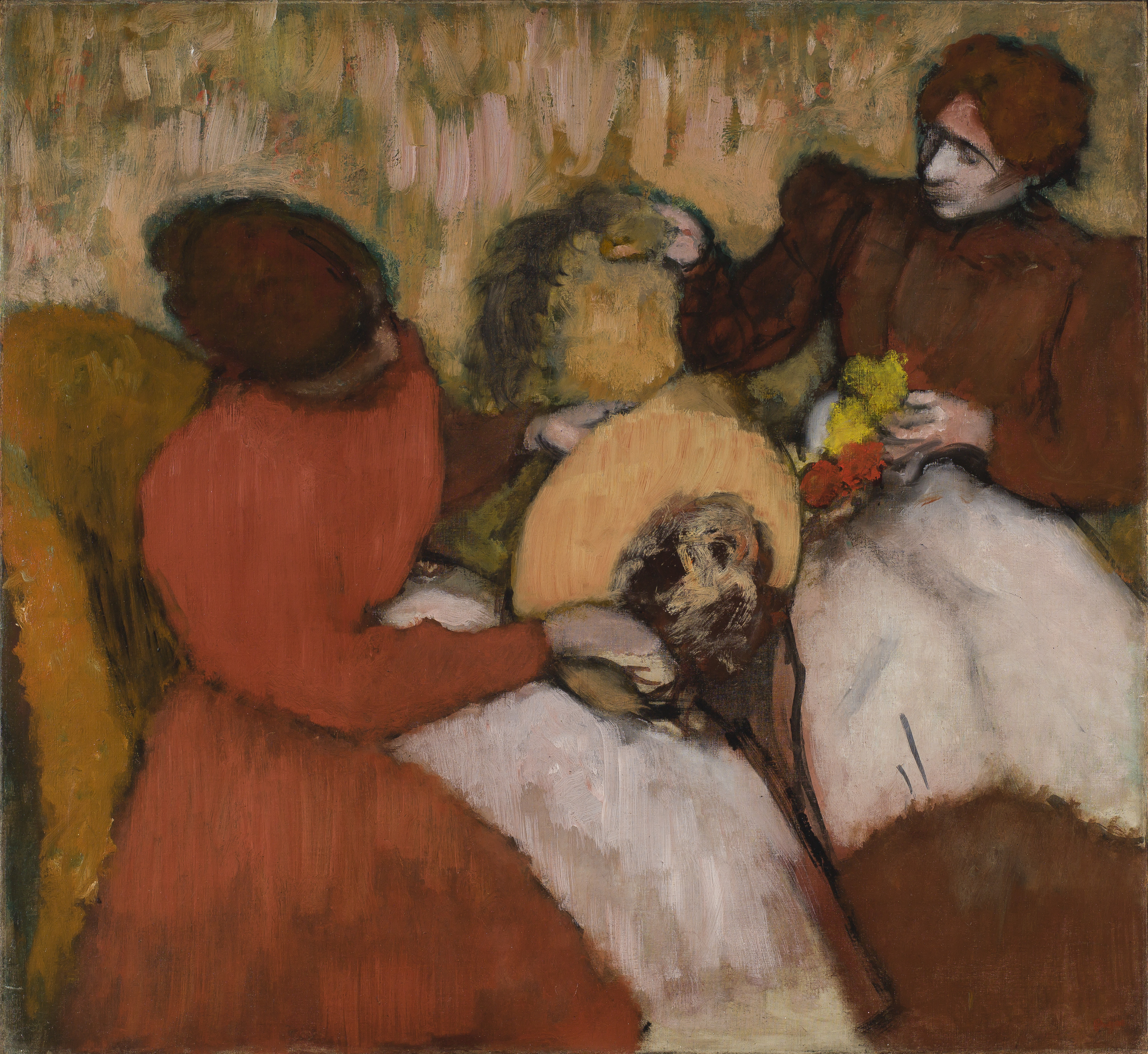
The Milliners, c. 1898, St. Louis Art Museum

Blue Dancers, 1897, pastel on paper, Pushkin Museum, Moscow

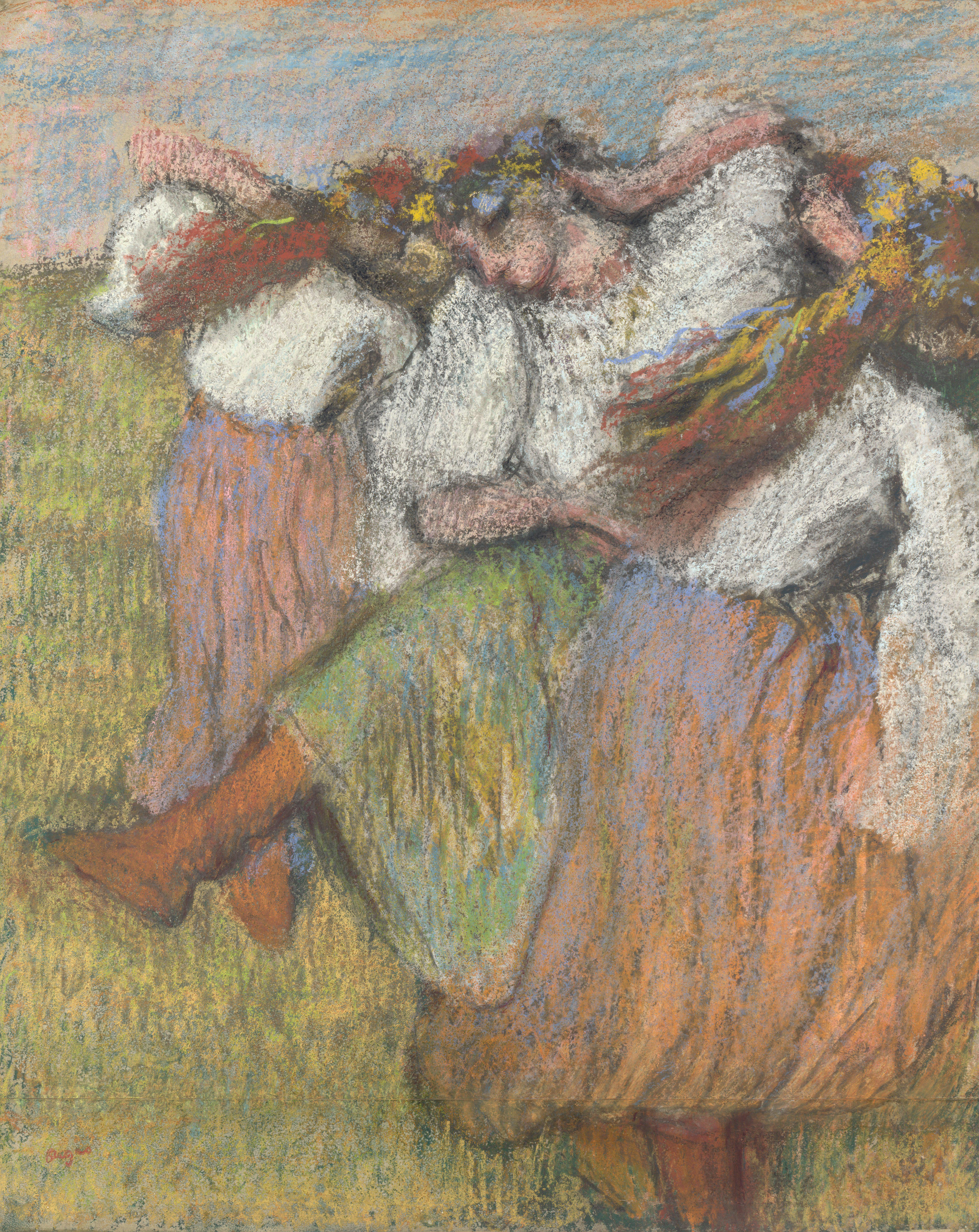
Ukrainian Dancers, c. 1899, pastel and charcoal on paper, 73 × 59 cm, The National Gallery, London

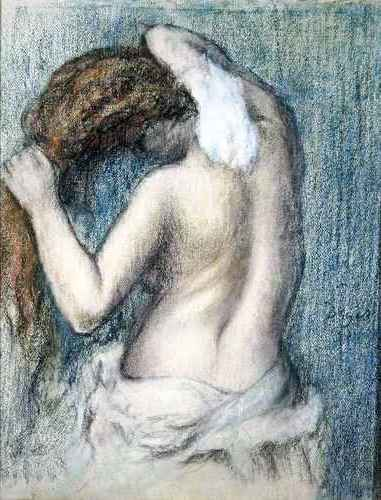
Woman Washing, c. 1906, Museo Soumaya, Mexico City

=== Nudes ===
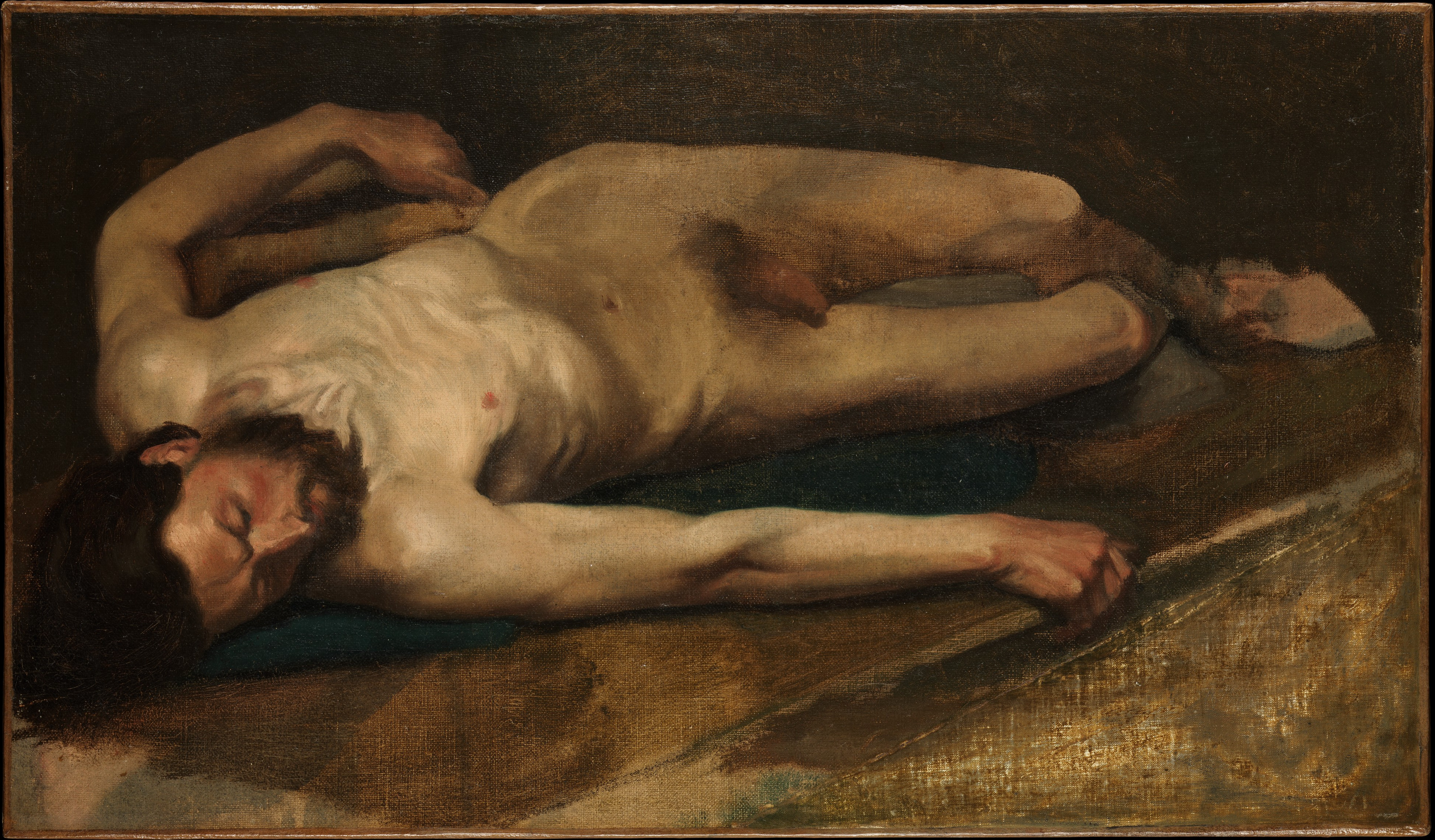
Male Nude, 1856, oil on canvas, Metropolitan Museum of Art, New York City

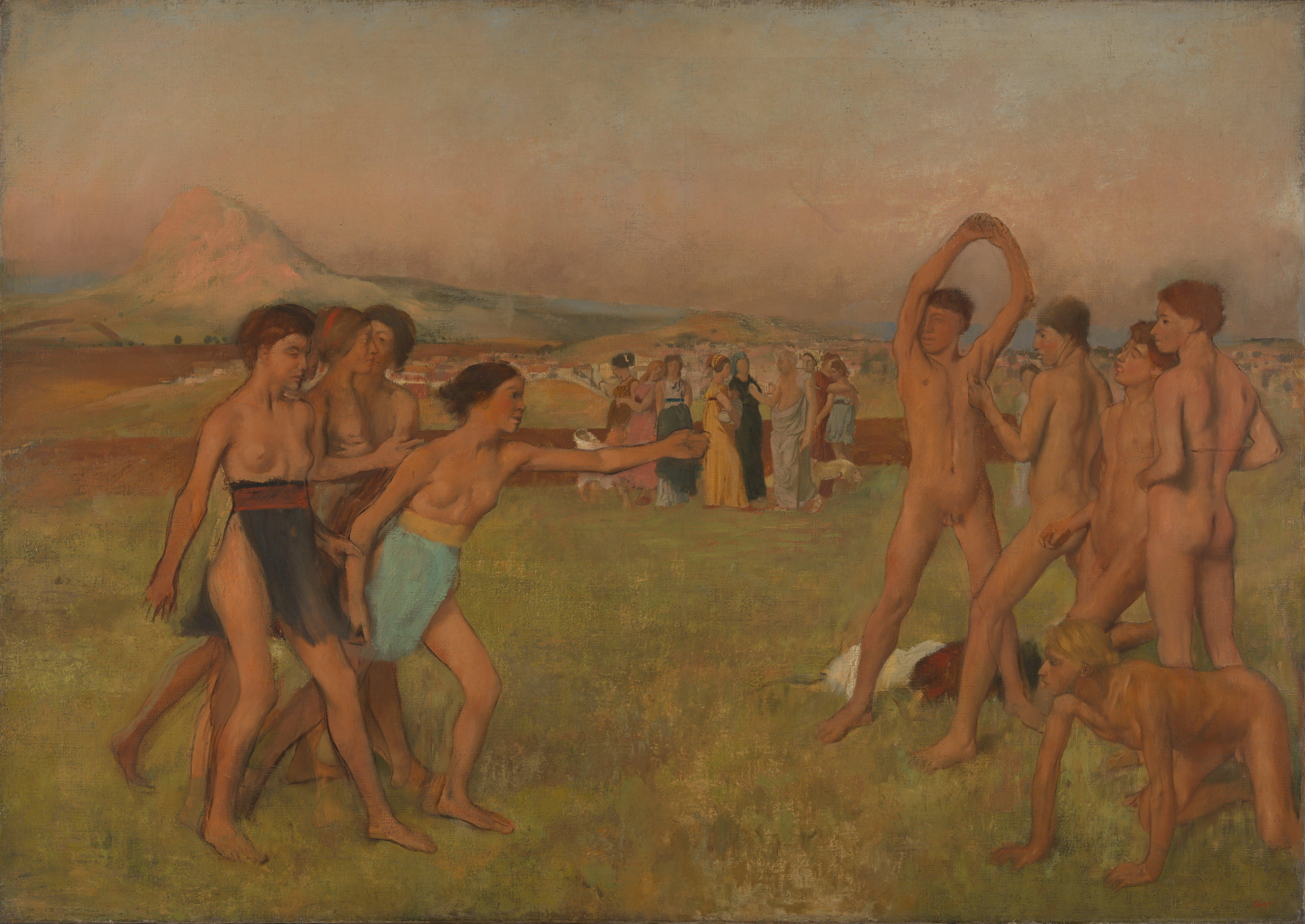
Young Spartans Exercising, c. 1860–1862, National Gallery, London

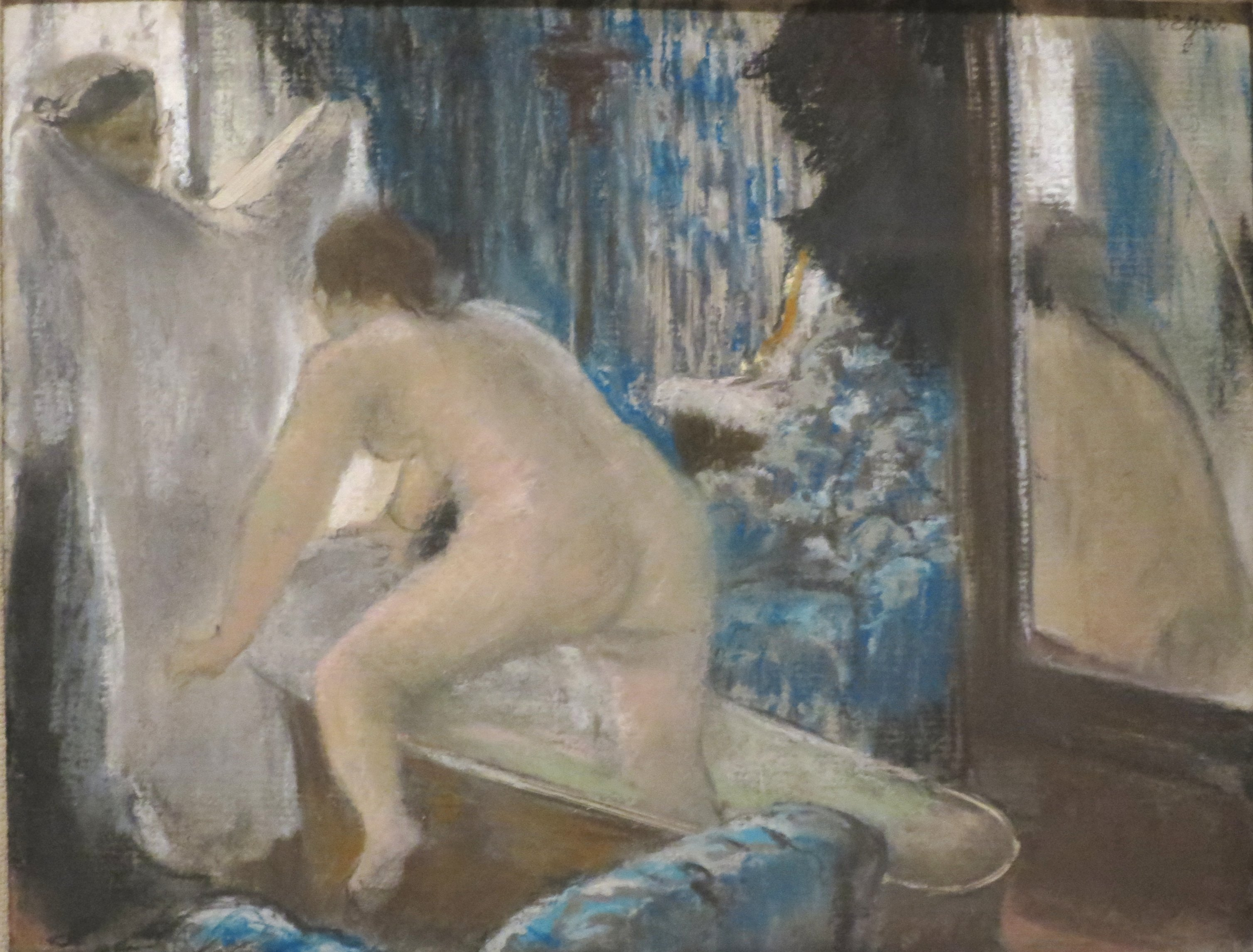
Woman Getting out of the Bath, 1877, Norton Simon Museum, Pasadena

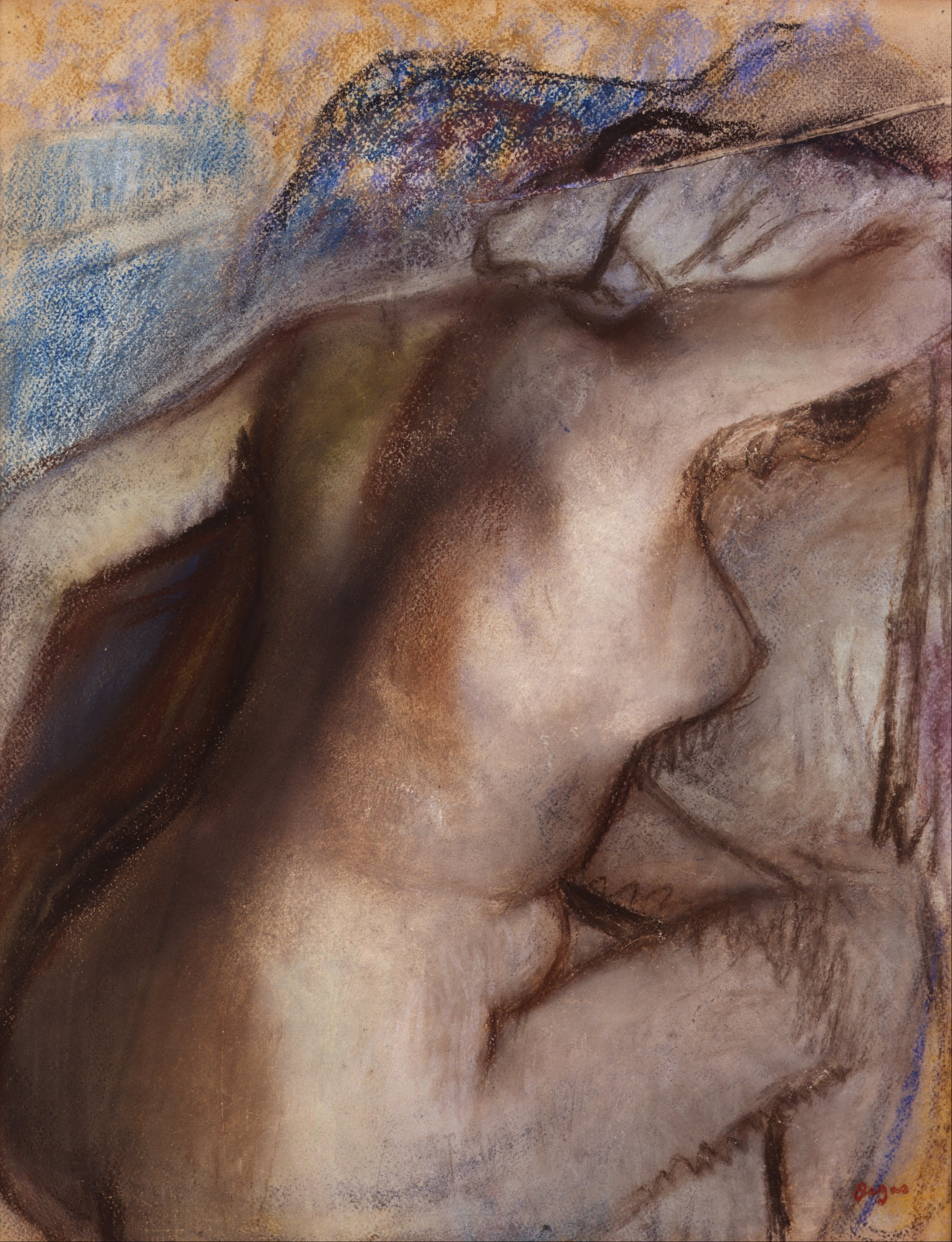
After the Bath, Woman Drying Herself, c. 1884–1886, reworked between 1890 and 1900, pastel on wove paper, 40.5 × 32 cm, Musée Malraux, Le Havre

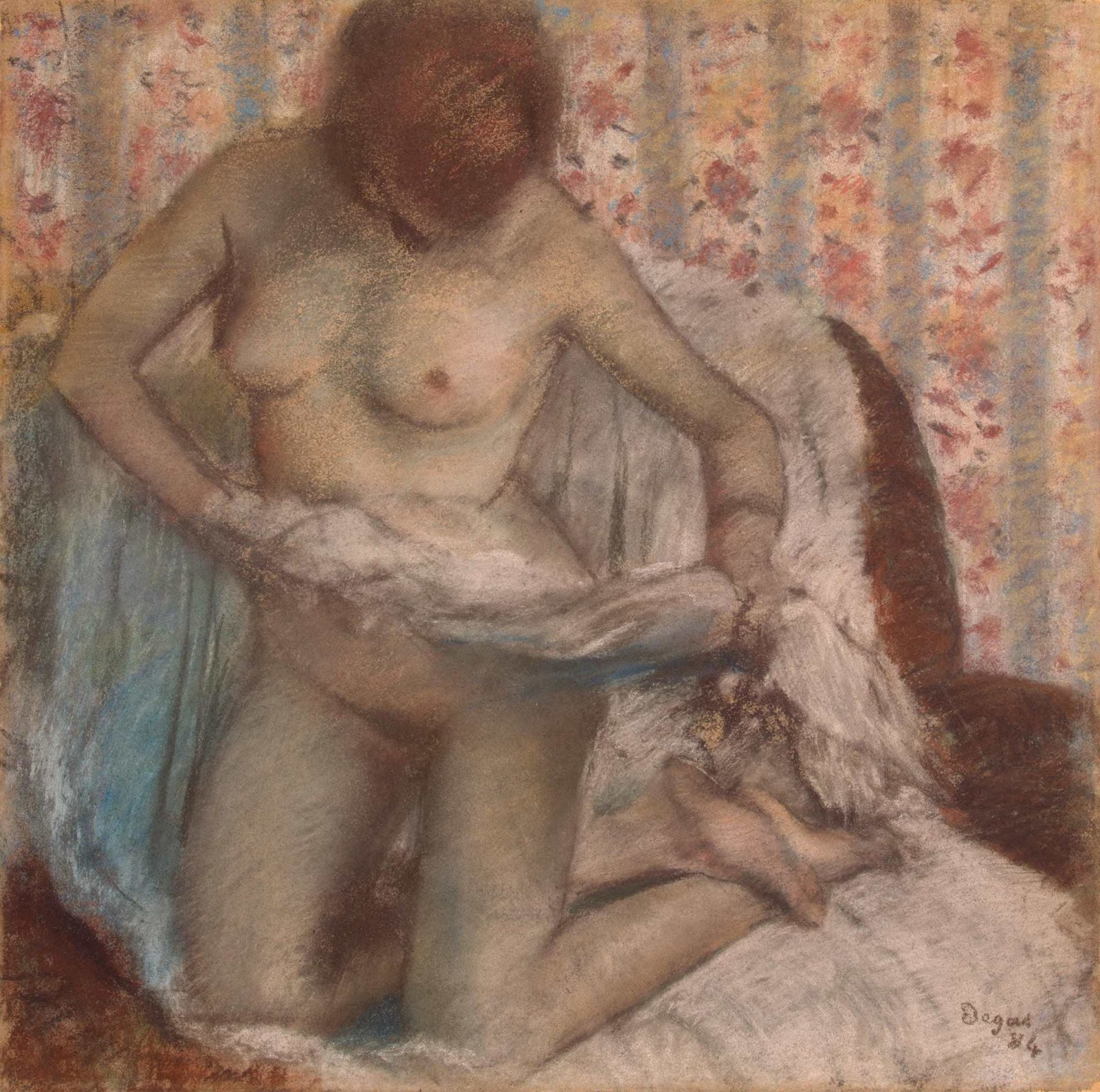
Kneeling Woman, 1884, Pushkin Museum, Moscow

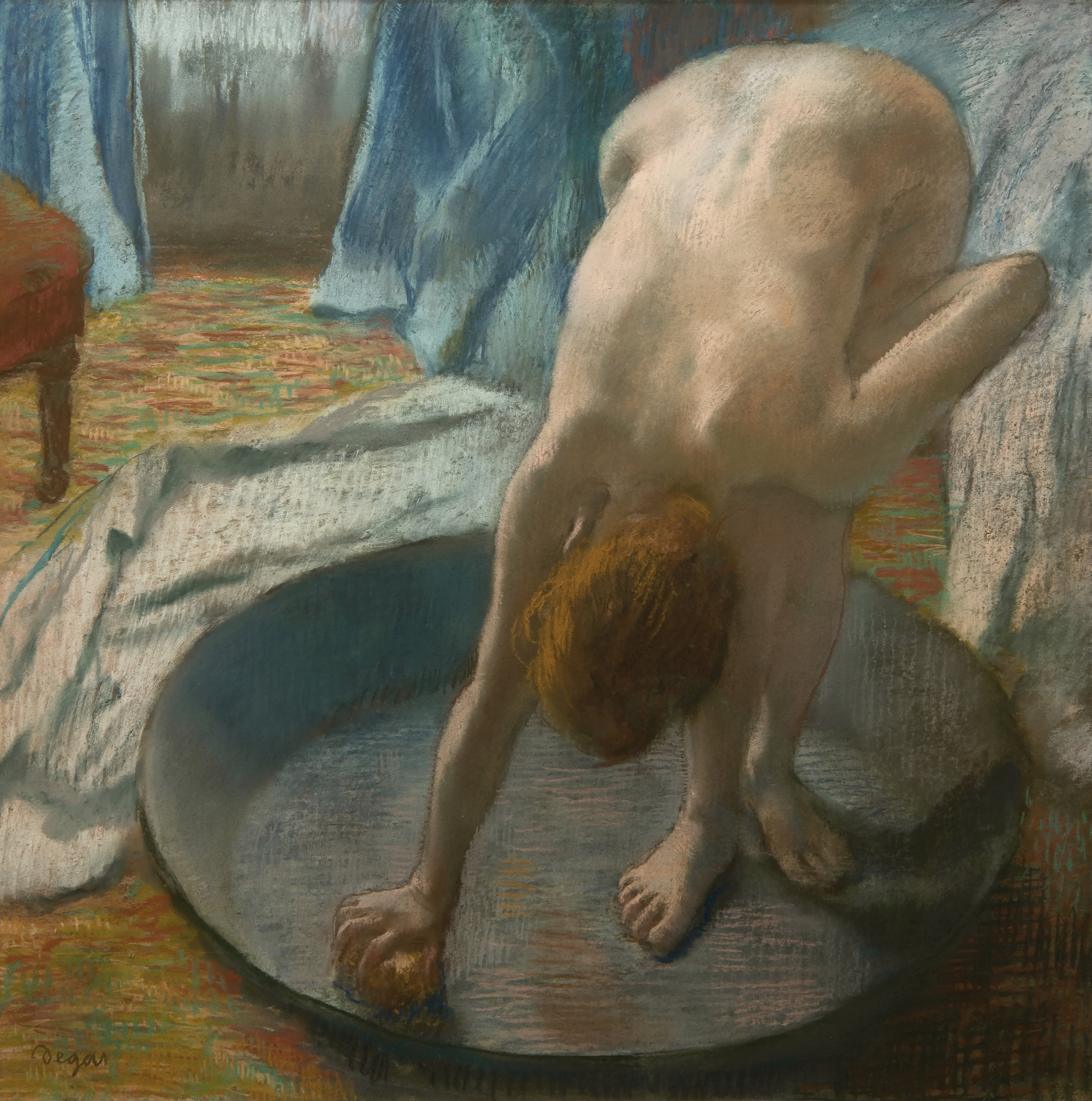
Woman in a Tub, 1886, Hill-Stead Museum, Farmington, Connecticut

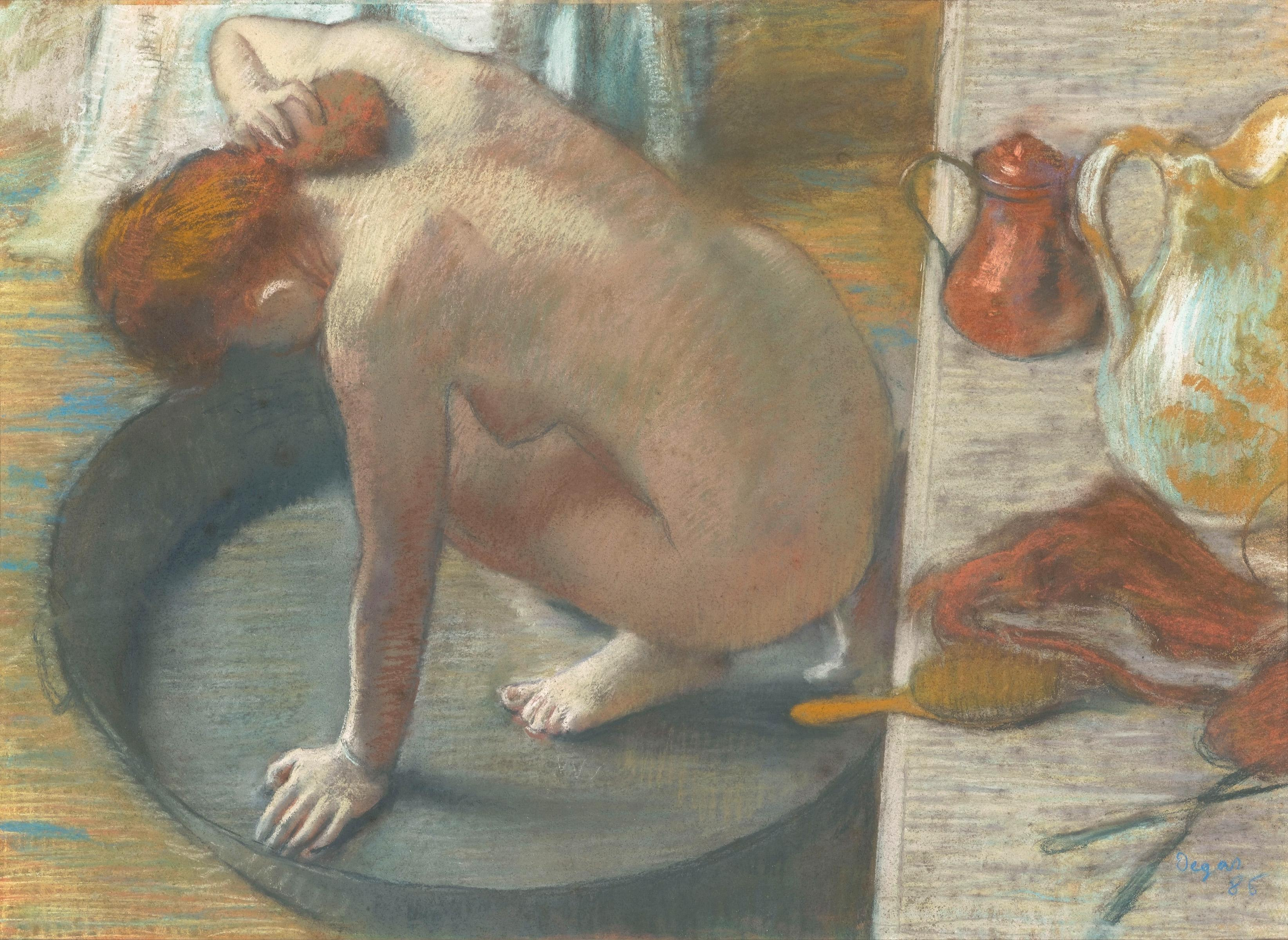
The Tub, 1886, Musée d'Orsay, Paris, France

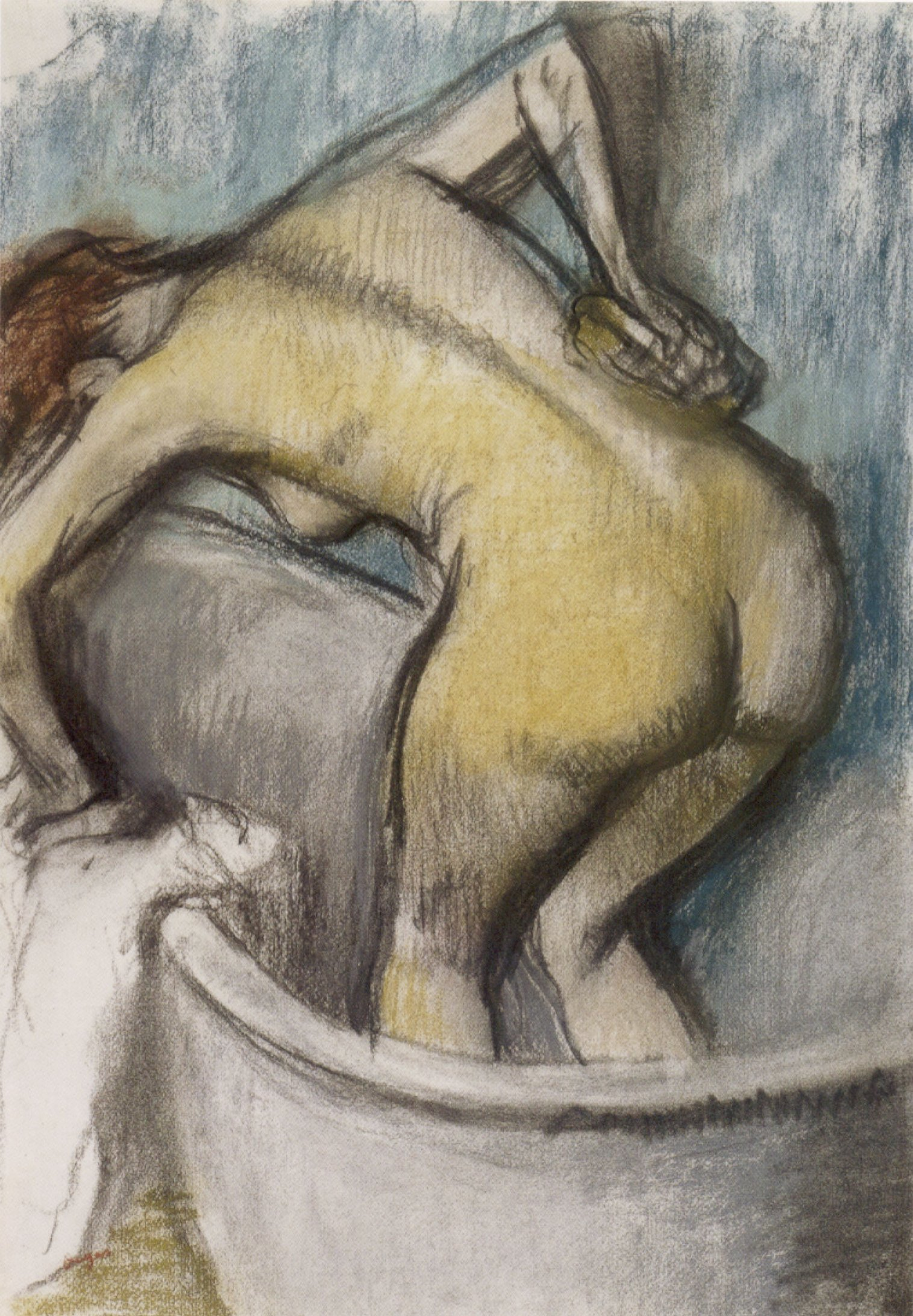
The Bath: Woman Sponging Her Back, c. 1887, pastel on paper, Honolulu Museum of Art

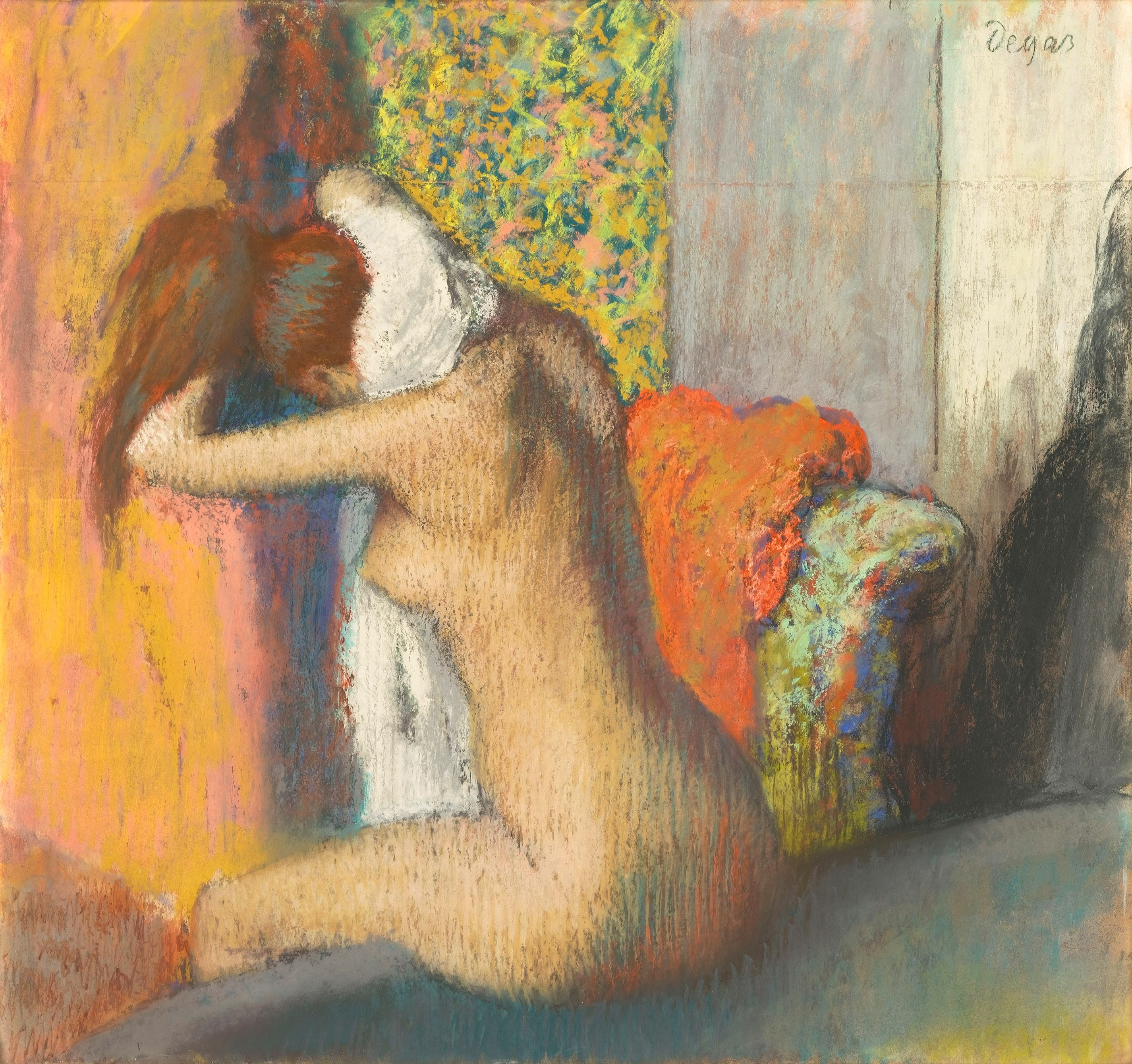
After the Bath, Woman Drying her Nape, pastel on paper, 1898, Musée d'Orsay, Paris

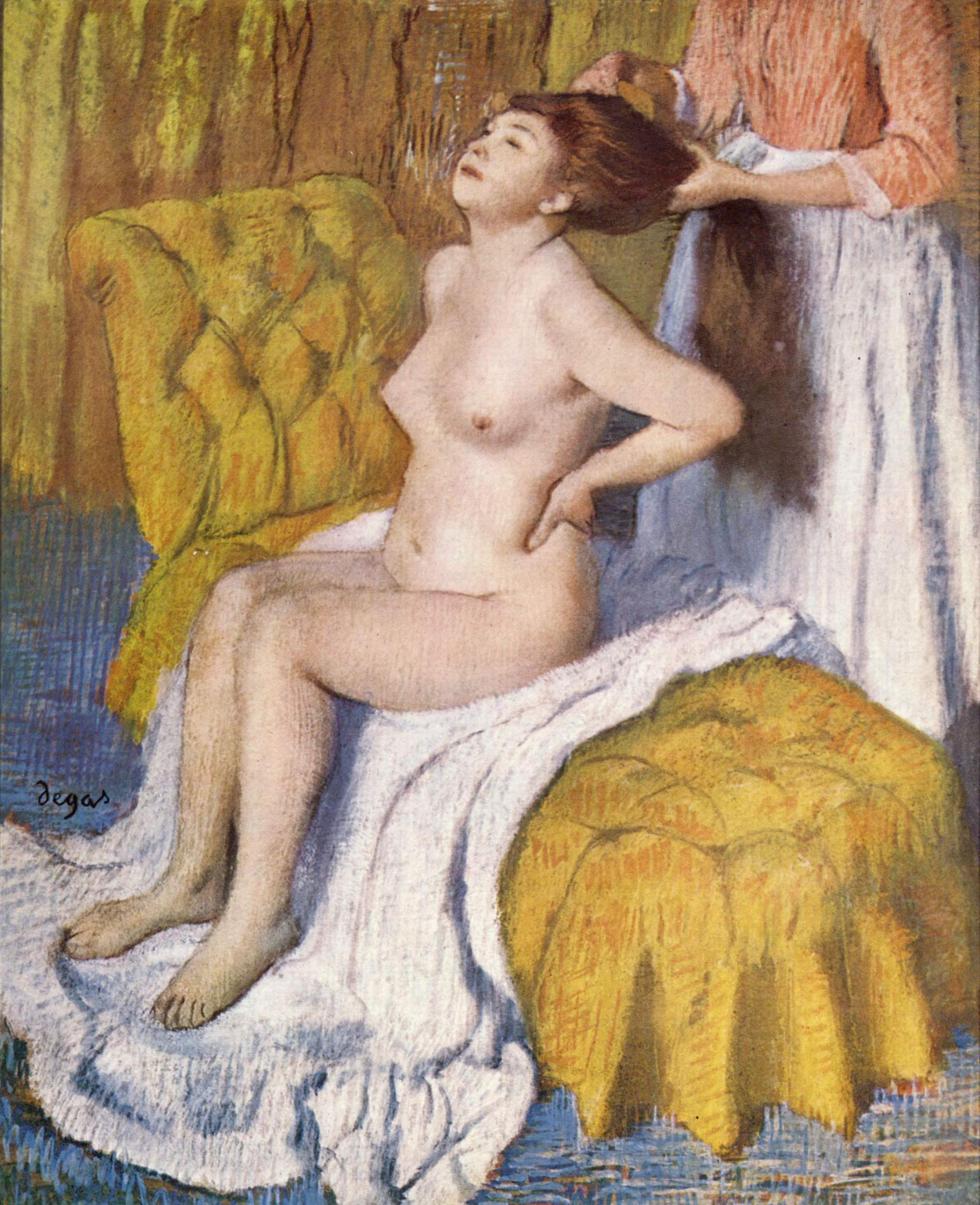
Woman Having her Hair Combed, pastel, c. 1885, Metropolitan Museum of Art, New York

=== Sculptures ===
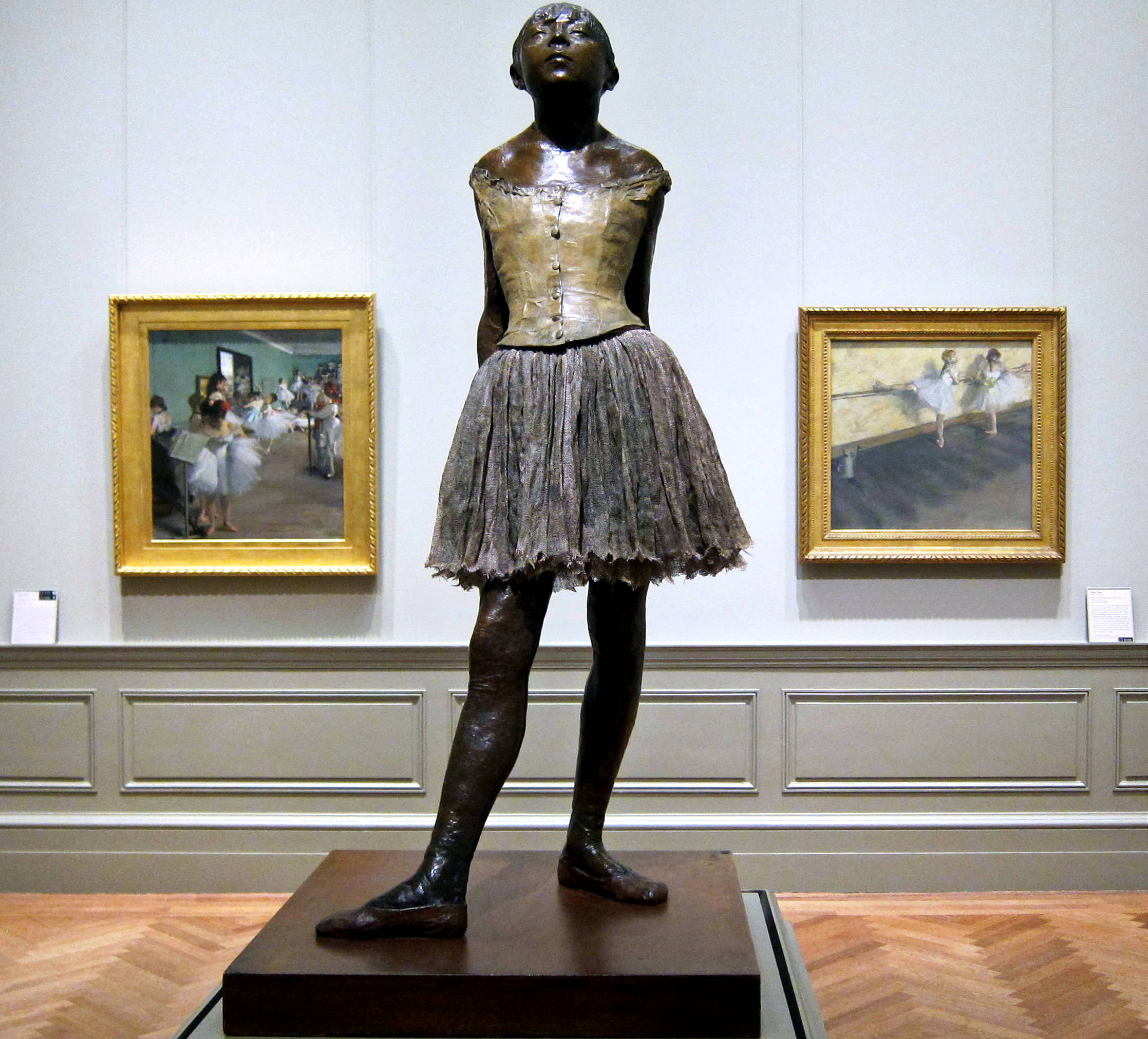
Little Dancer of Fourteen Years
Cast posthumously in 1922 from a mixed-media sculpture modeled
c. 1879–1880
Bronze
Partly tinted, with cotton skirt and satin hair ribbon, on a wooden base
Metropolitan Museum of Art
New York City

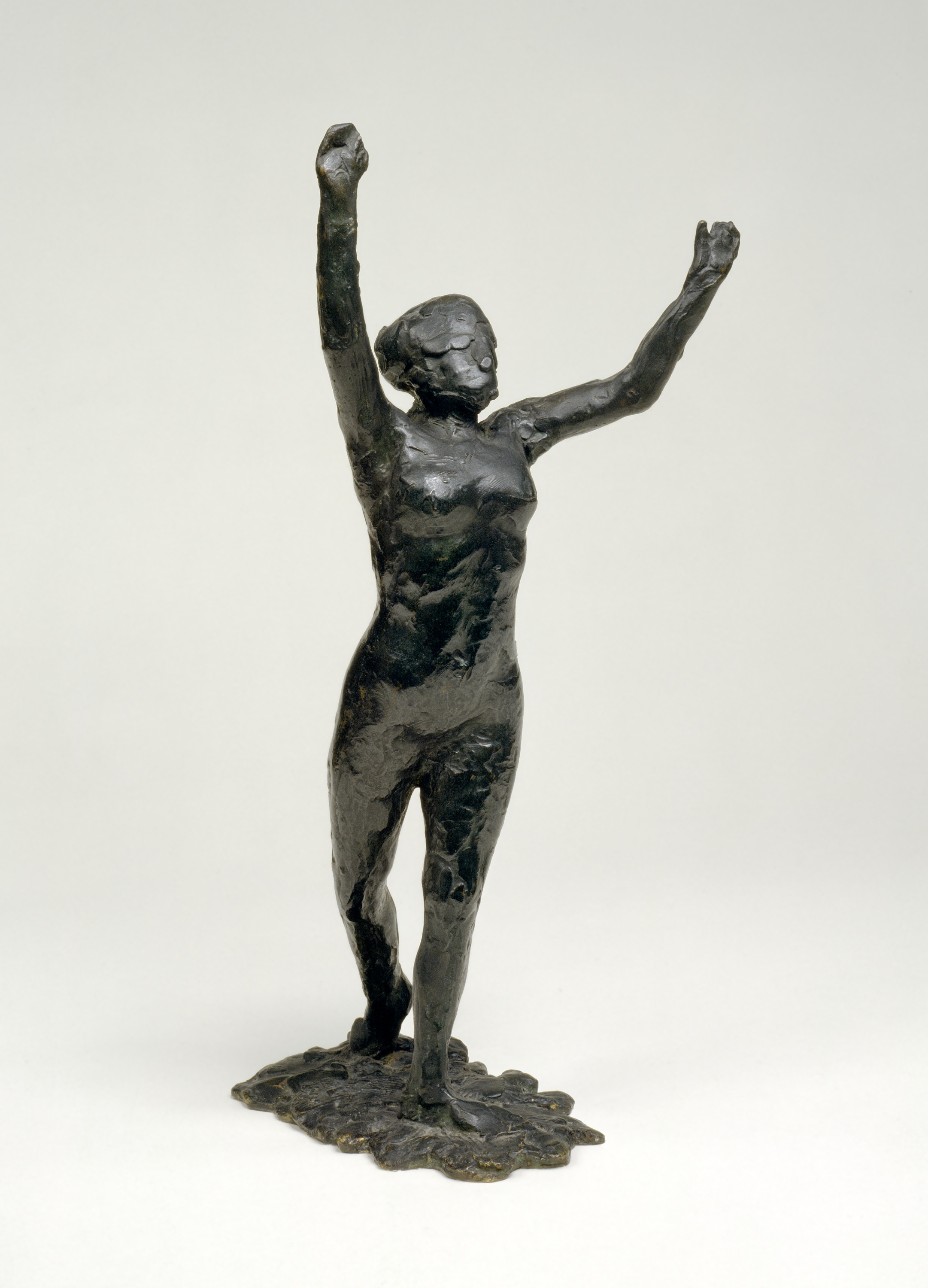
Dancer Moving Forward, Arms Raised
c. 1882–1895
Cast posthumously 1919–1926
Bronze
Solomon R. Guggenheim Museum
Thannhauser Galleries
New York City

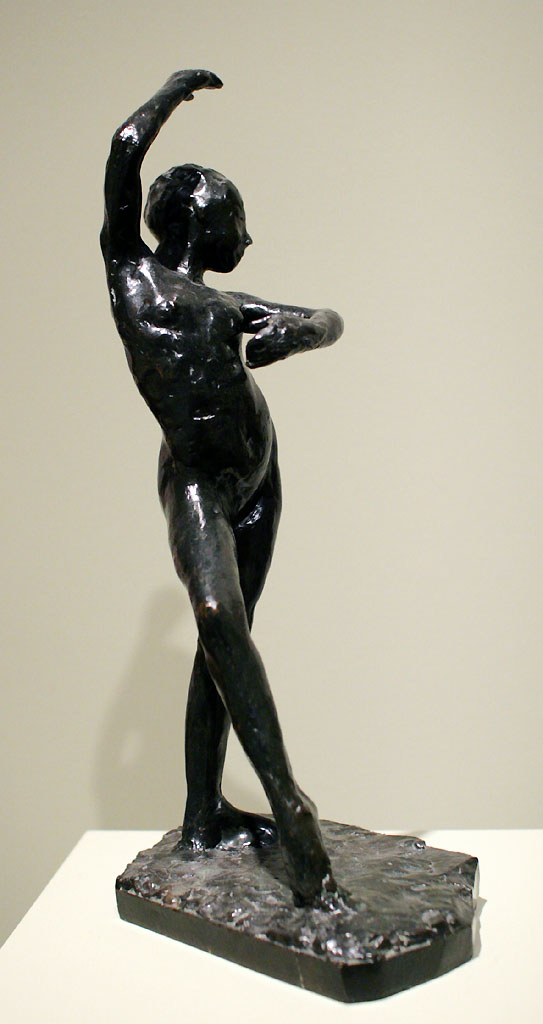
The Spanish Dance
c. 1885
Cast posthumously in 1921
Bronze
46.3 × 14.3 cm
Ackland Art Museum
Chapel Hill, North Carolina

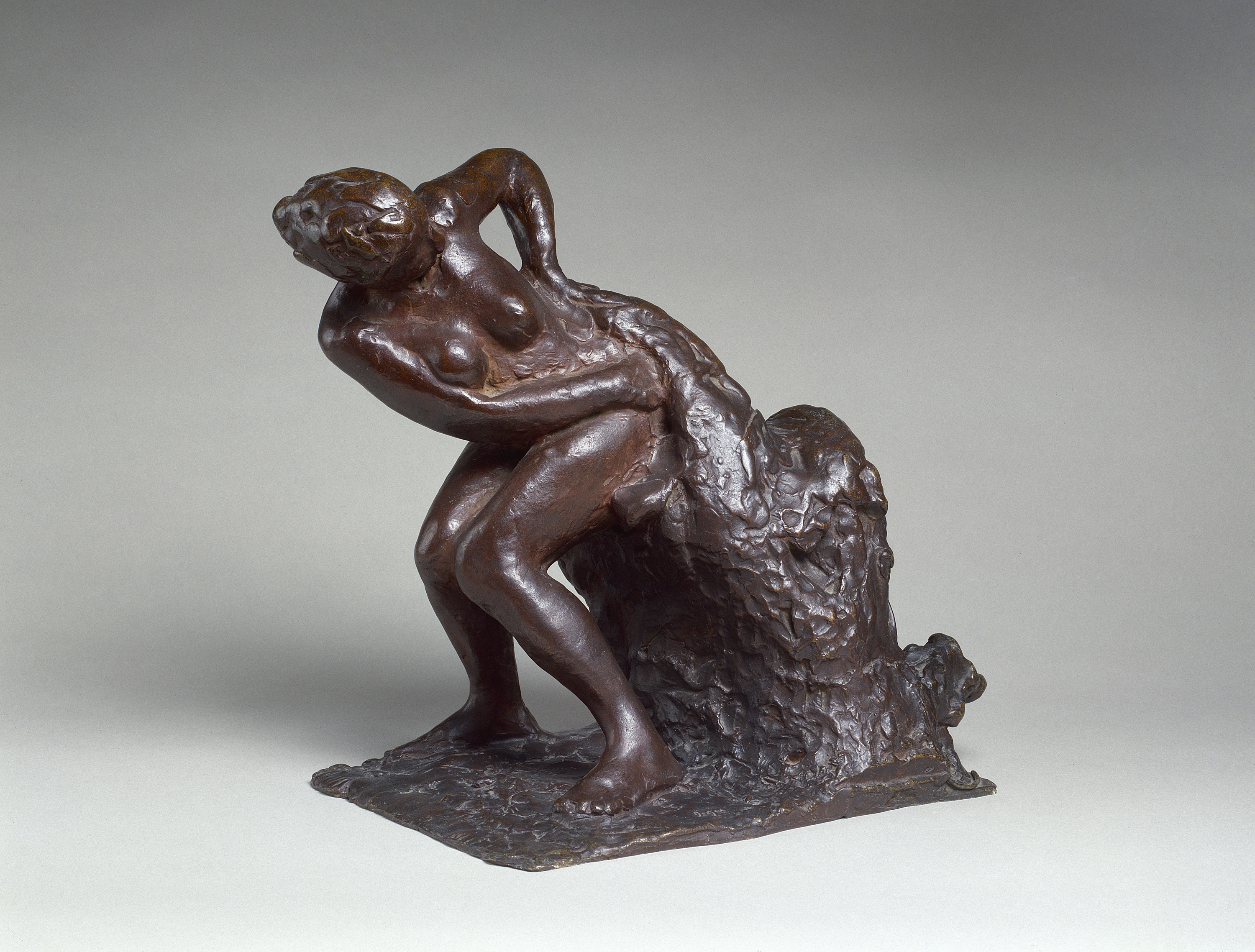
Seated Woman, Wiping Her Left Side
c. 1896–1911
Cast posthumously 1919–1926
Bronze
Solomon R. Guggenheim Museum
Thannhauser Galleries
New York City
