= Henri de Toulouse-Lautrec =

French painter and illustrator (1864–1901)

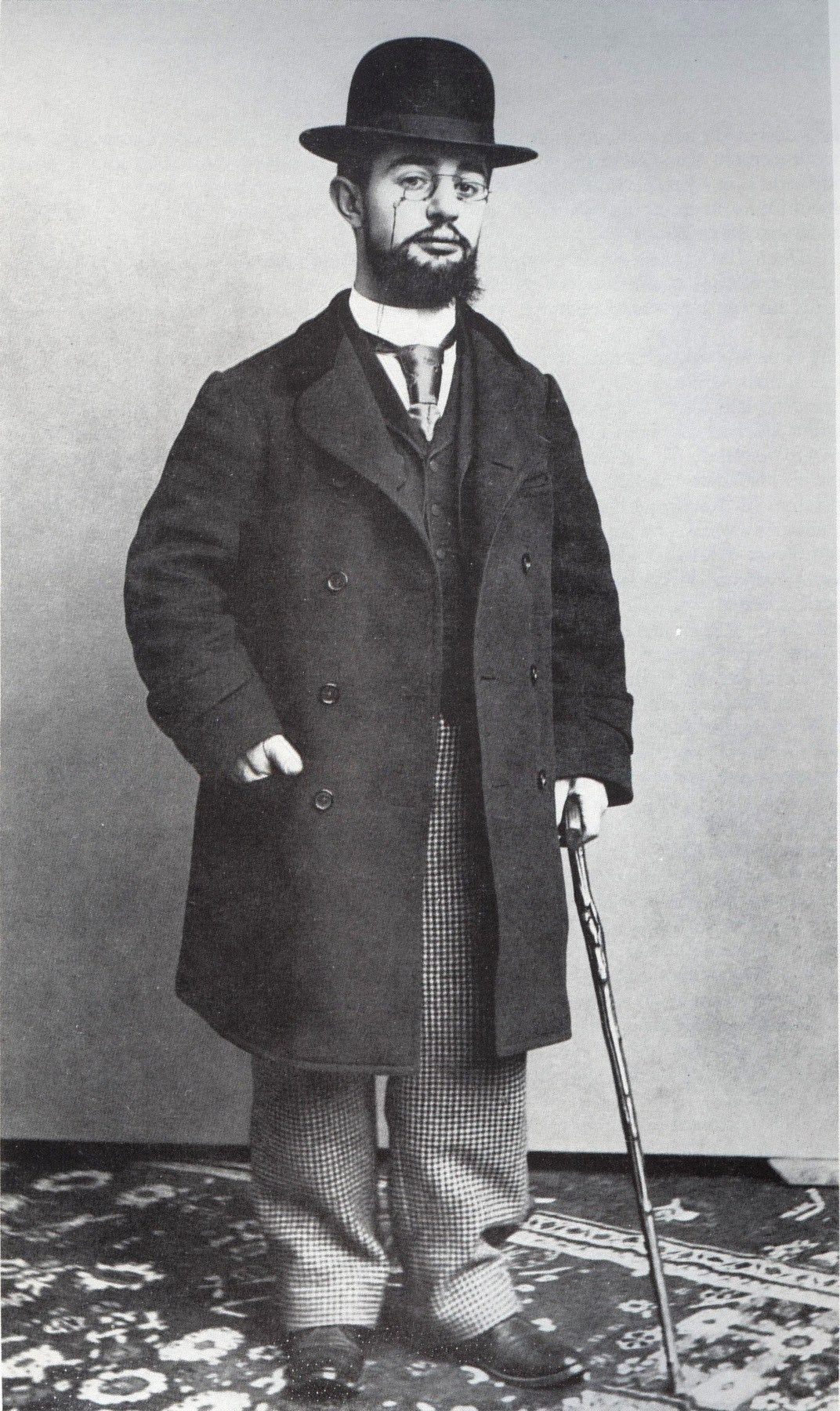
- Toulouse-Lautrec in 1894
- Born: Henri Marie Raymond de Toulouse-Lautrec-Montfa; 24 November 1864; Albi, Second French Empire
- Died: 9 September 1901 (aged 36); Saint-André-du-Bois, French Third Republic
- Resting place: Verdelais Cemetery
- Known for: Painting, printmaking, drawing, draughting, illustration
- Notable work: At the Moulin Rouge; Le Lit; La Toilette
- Movement: Post-Impressionism, Art Nouveau

Signature
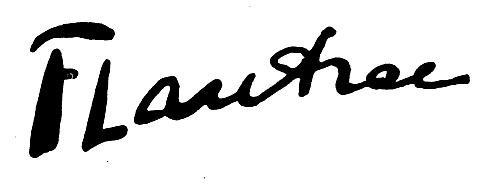

Comte Henri Marie Raymond de Toulouse-Lautrec-Montfa (24 November 1864 – 9 September 1901), known as Toulouse-Lautrec (French: [tuluz lotʁɛk]), was a French painter, printmaker, draughtsman, caricaturist, and illustrator. His immersion in the colourful and theatrical life of Paris's Belle Époque in the late 19th century allowed him to produce popular works of art from decadent affairs.

Born into the aristocracy, Toulouse-Lautrec broke both his legs during adolescence, leaving him with a stunted appearance. In later life, he developed an affinity for brothels and prostitutes that directed the subject matter for many of his works, which record details of the late-19th-century bohemian lifestyle in Paris. He is among the painters described as Post-Impressionists, with Paul Cézanne, Vincent van Gogh, Paul Gauguin, and Georges Seurat also commonly considered as belonging in this loose group.

== Early life ==
Henri Marie Raymond de Toulouse-Lautrec-Montfa was born at Demoiselles d'Imbert du Bosc (his great-aunts) home at rue de l'École Mage (presently 14, rue Henri de Toulouse Lautrec), Albi, in the south of France, the firstborn child of Count Alphonse de Toulouse-Lautrec Montfa (1838–1913) and Adèle Zoë Tapié de Celeyran (1841–1930). He was a member of an aristocratic family (descended from both the Counts of Toulouse and Odet de Foix, Vicomte de Lautrec, as well as the Viscounts of Montfa). His younger brother was born in 1867 but died the following year. Both sons enjoyed the titres de courtoisie of Comte. If Toulouse-Lautrec had outlived his father, he would have inherited the family title of Comte de Toulouse-Lautrec.

After the death of his brother, Toulouse-Lautrec's parents separated, and a nanny cared for him. At the age of eight, Toulouse-Lautrec lived with his mother in Paris, where he drew sketches and caricatures in his exercise workbooks. A friend of his father, René Princeteau, sometimes visited to give informal lessons. Some of Toulouse-Lautrec's early paintings are of horses, a speciality of Princeteau's and a subject Toulouse-Lautrec later revisited in his "Circus Paintings".

In 1875, Toulouse-Lautrec returned to Albi because his mother had concerns about his health. He took thermal baths at Amélie-les-Bains, and his mother consulted doctors in the hope of finding a way to improve her son's growth and development.

=== Disability and health problems ===
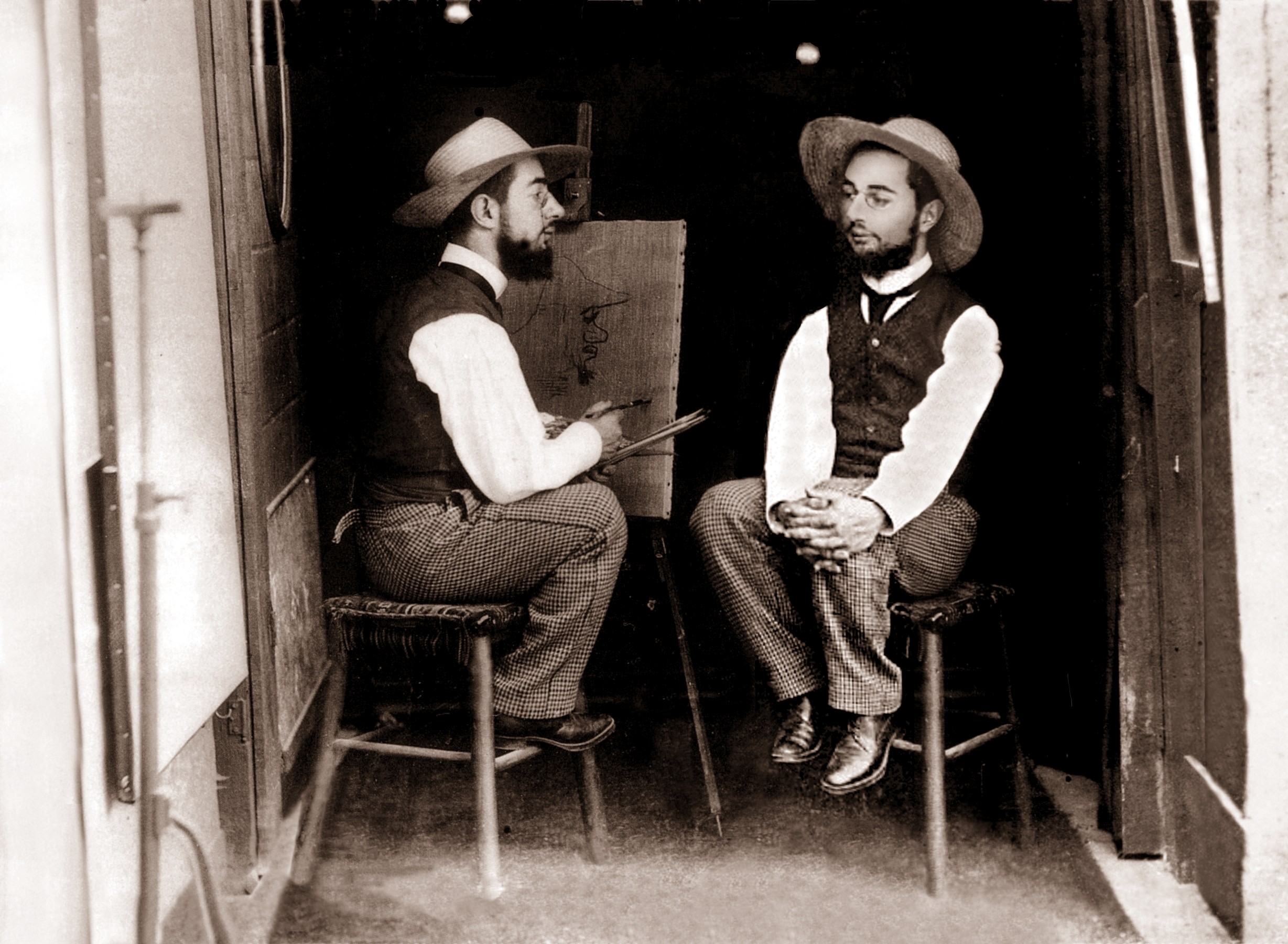
Mr. Toulouse paints Mr. Lautrec (c. 1891), a photomontage by Maurice Guibert

Toulouse-Lautrec's parents were first cousins (their mothers were sisters), and his congenital health conditions have often been attributed to a family history of inbreeding.

At the age of 13, Toulouse-Lautrec fractured his right femur, and at age 14, he fractured his left femur. The breaks did not heal properly. Modern physicians attribute this to an unknown genetic disorder, possibly pycnodysostosis (sometimes known as 'Toulouse-Lautrec Syndrome'), or a variant disorder along the lines of osteopetrosis, achondroplasia, or osteogenesis imperfecta. Toulouse-Lautrec's legs ceased to grow when he reached 1.52 m (5 ft 0 in). He developed an adult torso while retaining his child-sized legs.

== Paris ==
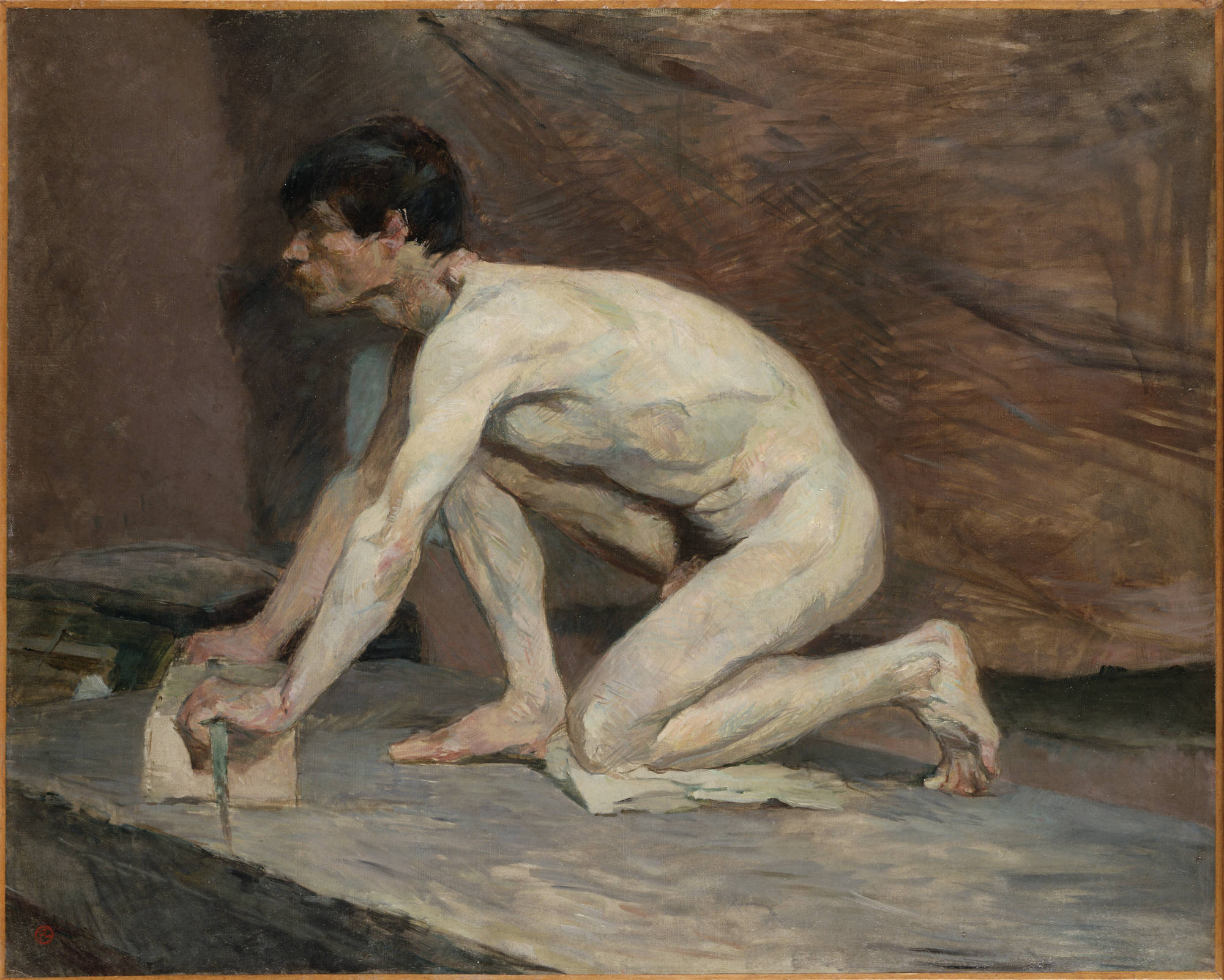
The Marble Polisher (1882–1887), Princeton University Art Museum, probably painted while a student of Fernand Cormon, demonstrating his classical training

During a stay in Nice on the French Riviera, his progress in painting and drawing impressed Princeteau, who persuaded Toulouse-Lautrec's parents to allow him to return to Paris and study under the portrait painter Léon Bonnat. He returned to Paris in 1882. Toulouse-Lautrec's mother had high ambitions and, with the aim of her son becoming a fashionable and respected painter, used their family's influence to gain him entry to Bonnat's studio. He was drawn to Montmartre, the area of Paris known for its bohemian lifestyle and the haunt of artists, writers, and philosophers. Studying with Bonnat placed Toulouse-Lautrec in the heart of Montmartre, an area he rarely left over the next 20 years.

After Bonnat took a new job, Toulouse-Lautrec moved to the studio of Fernand Cormon in 1882 and studied for a further five years and established the group of friends he kept for the rest of his life. At this time, he met Émile Bernard and Vincent van Gogh. Cormon, whose instruction was more relaxed than Bonnat's, allowed his pupils to roam Paris, looking for subjects to paint. During this period, Toulouse-Lautrec had his first encounter with a prostitute (reputedly sponsored by his friends), which led him to paint his first painting of a prostitute in Montmartre, a woman rumoured to be Marie-Charlet.

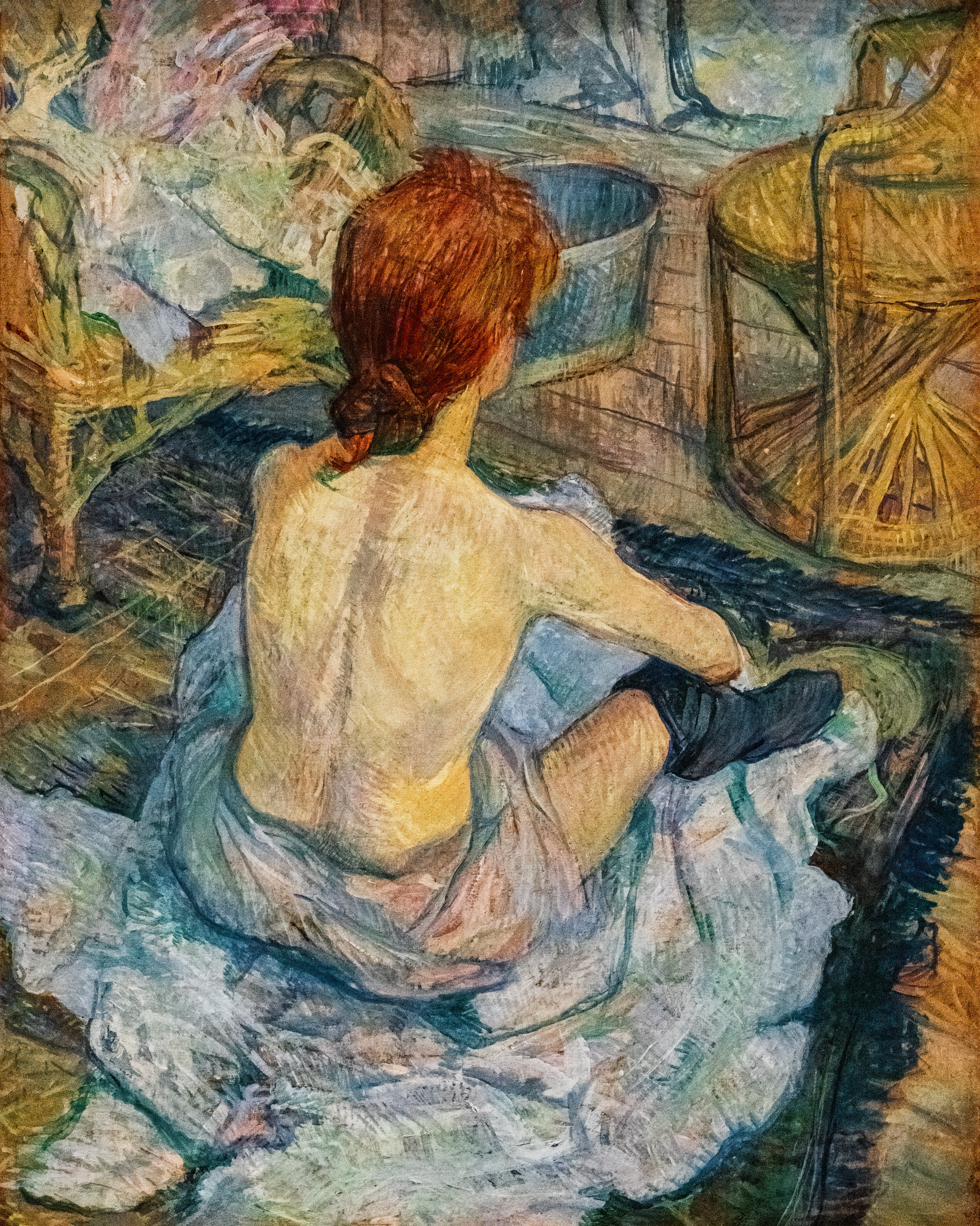
La Toilette (1889), oil on board

=== Early career ===
In 1885, Toulouse-Lautrec began to exhibit his work at the cabaret of Aristide Bruant's Mirliton.

With his studies finished, Toulouse-Lautrec participated in an exposition in 1887 in Toulouse using the pseudonym "Tréclau", the verlan of the family name "Lautrec". He later exhibited in Paris with Van Gogh and Louis Anquetin.

In 1885, Toulouse-Lautrec met Suzanne Valadon. He made several portraits of her and supported her ambition as an artist. It is believed that they were lovers and that she wanted to marry him. Their relationship ended, and Valadon attempted suicide in 1888.

=== Rise to recognition ===
In 1888, the Belgian critic Octave Maus invited Lautrec to present eleven pieces at the Les XX (the 'Twenties') exhibition in Brussels in February. Theo van Gogh, the brother of Vincent van Gogh, bought Poudre de Riz ('Rice Powder') for 150 francs for the Goupil & Cie gallery. From 1889 to 1894, Toulouse-Lautrec took part in the Salon des Indépendants regularly. He made several landscapes of Montmartre. Tucked deep into Montmartre in Monsieur Pere Foret's garden, Toulouse-Lautrec executed a series of pleasant en plein air paintings of Carmen Gaudin, the same red-headed model who appears in The Laundress (1888).

In 1890, during the banquet of Les XX exhibition in Brussels, he challenged to a duel the artist Henry de Groux, who criticised van Gogh's works. Paul Signac also declared he would continue to fight for Van Gogh's honour if Lautrec was killed. De Groux apologised for the slight and left the group, and the duel never took place.

Toulouse-Lautrec contributed several illustrations to the magazine Le Rire during the mid-1890s.

Woman Smoking a Cigarette, 1890, Brooklyn Museum.

=== Interactions with women ===
In addition to his growing alcoholism, Toulouse-Lautrec also visited prostitutes. He was fascinated by their lifestyle as well as that of the "urban underclass", and he incorporated those characters into his paintings. Fellow painter Édouard Vuillard later said that while Toulouse-Lautrec did engage in sex with prostitutes, "the real reasons for his behaviour were moral ones ... Lautrec was too proud to submit to his lot, as a physical freak, an aristocrat cut off from his kind by his grotesque appearance. He found an affinity between his condition and the moral penury of the prostitute."

The prostitutes inspired Toulouse-Lautrec. He would frequently visit a brothel located in Rue d'Amboise, where he had a favourite called Mireille. He created about a hundred drawings and fifty paintings inspired by the life of these women. In 1892 and 1893, he created a series of two women in bed together called Le Lit, and in 1894 he painted Salón de la Rue des Moulins from memory in his studio.

Toulouse-Lautrec declared, "A model is always a stuffed doll, but these women are alive. I wouldn't venture to pay them the hundred sous to sit for me, and God knows whether they would be worth it. They stretch out on the sofas like animals, make no demand and they are not in the least bit conceited." He was well appreciated by the women, saying, "I have found girls of my own size! Nowhere else do I feel so much at home."

=== The Moulin Rouge ===
When the Moulin Rouge cabaret opened in 1889, Toulouse-Lautrec was commissioned to produce a series of posters. His mother had left Paris and, though he had a regular income from his family, making posters offered him a living of his own. Other artists looked down on the work, but he ignored them. The cabaret reserved a seat for him and displayed his paintings. Among the works that he painted for the Moulin Rouge and other Parisian nightclubs are depictions of the singer Yvette Guilbert; the dancer Louise Weber, better known as La Goulue ('The Glutton'); and the much subtler dancer Jane Avril.

Other café-concerts also commissioned posters from Toulouse-Lautrec, such as the Café des Ambassadeurs, for which he made the now iconic poster of his friend Aristide Bruant, when he moved there in 1892.

== London ==
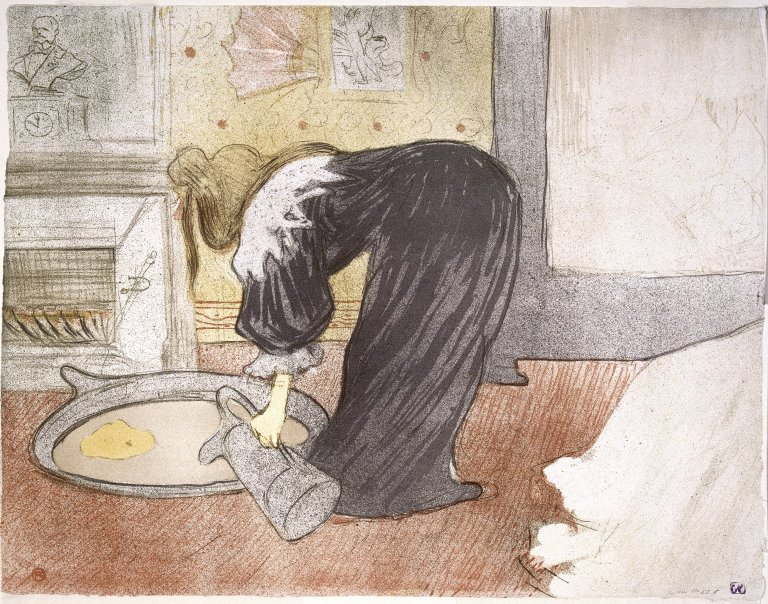
Woman at the Tub from the portfolio Elles (1896)

Toulouse-Lautrec's family were Anglophiles, and though he was not as fluent as he pretended to be, he spoke English well enough. He travelled to London, where he was commissioned by the J. & E. Bella company to make a poster advertising their paper confetti (plaster confetti was banned after the 1892 Mardi Gras) and the bicycle advert La Chaîne Simpson.

While in London, Toulouse-Lautrec met and befriended Oscar Wilde. When Wilde faced imprisonment in Britain, Toulouse-Lautrec became a very vocal supporter of him, and his portrait of Oscar Wilde was painted the same year as Wilde's trial.

== Lifestyle ==
=== Alcoholism ===
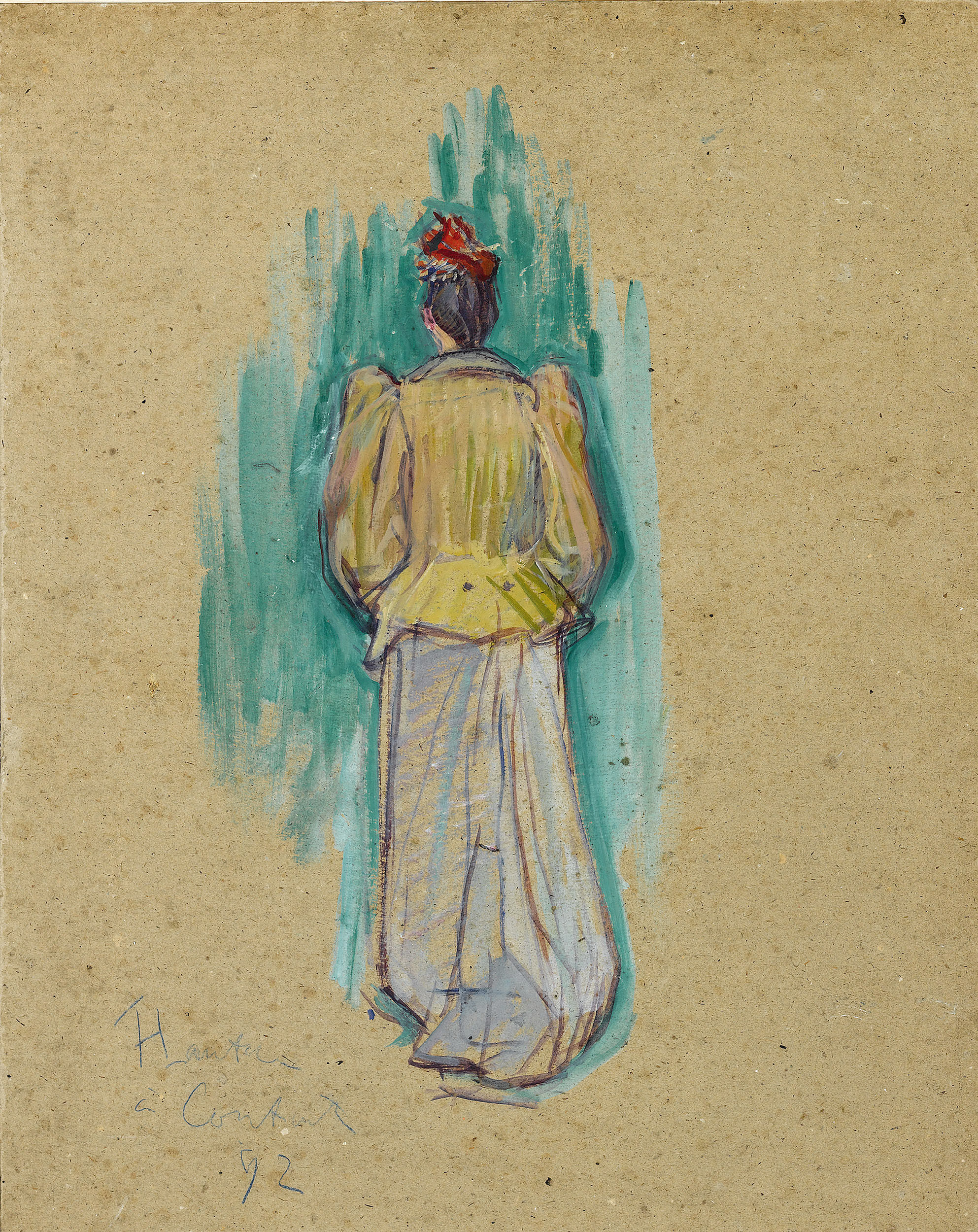
La Promeneuse (1892), oil on cardboard

Toulouse-Lautrec was mocked for his short stature and physical appearance, which some biographers theorise may have contributed to his alcoholism.

Initially, Toulouse-Lautrec only drank beer and wine, but his tastes expanded into spirits, namely absinthe. The "Earthquake Cocktail" (Tremblement de Terre) is attributed to Toulouse-Lautrec: a potent mixture containing half absinthe and half cognac in a wine goblet. Because of his underdeveloped legs, he walked with the aid of a cane, which he hollowed out and kept filled with liquor.

=== Cooking skills ===
Like Claude Monet, Lautrec was known for his cooking. Culinary historian Alexandra Leaf highlights Monet and Lautrec as the two "most serious gourmets" among their peers. Lautrec's love for cooking stemmed from his family upbringing and early childhood, where he first learned culinary values. Before he became widely known as a painter, he was called "Henri the cook" by his cousins.

Lautrec's penchant for art and cooking eventually led him to combine the visual and culinary arts, usually as a formal celebration of the release of new artworks, resulting in noteworthy parties for which he designed the menu (which were often artworks in themselves), bought and prepared the food, and created new cocktails. Lautrec's most famous party, held at the Natansons' Paris house in February 1895, is often regarded as one of the most notorious parties in art history. Three hundred guests were invited, with a claimed 2,000 cocktails served, all accompanied by side dishes of gourmet food, with Lautrec working diligently as the sole chef and bartender, dressed in a white linen jacket, complete with a freshly shaved bald head and no beard. Ironically, by the end of the night, Lautrec appeared to be the only one still awake and sober.

Lautrec was part of a group of gourmands, initially formed by Gustave Geffroy (1855–1926), the historian of the Impressionists, and Claude Monet, who met up every Friday night for dinner at Drouant, a restaurant in the Palais Garnier neighbourhood. After Lautrec's death, his close friend Maurice Joyant published Lautrec's collection of recipes – some original, some adapted – in the book La Cuisine de Monsieur Momo, Célibataire (1930), along with a colour book frontispiece of Toulouse Lautrec Cooking by Vuillard. It was revised in 1966 as L'art de la cuisine. The cookbook features 150 recipes, many of which were Lautrec's signature dishes, such as "Catalan salad". Art historian Charles Stuckey describes it as the first cookbook ever published by an artist, albeit posthumously. An English translation, The Art of Cuisine, was published in 1966.

== End of life ==
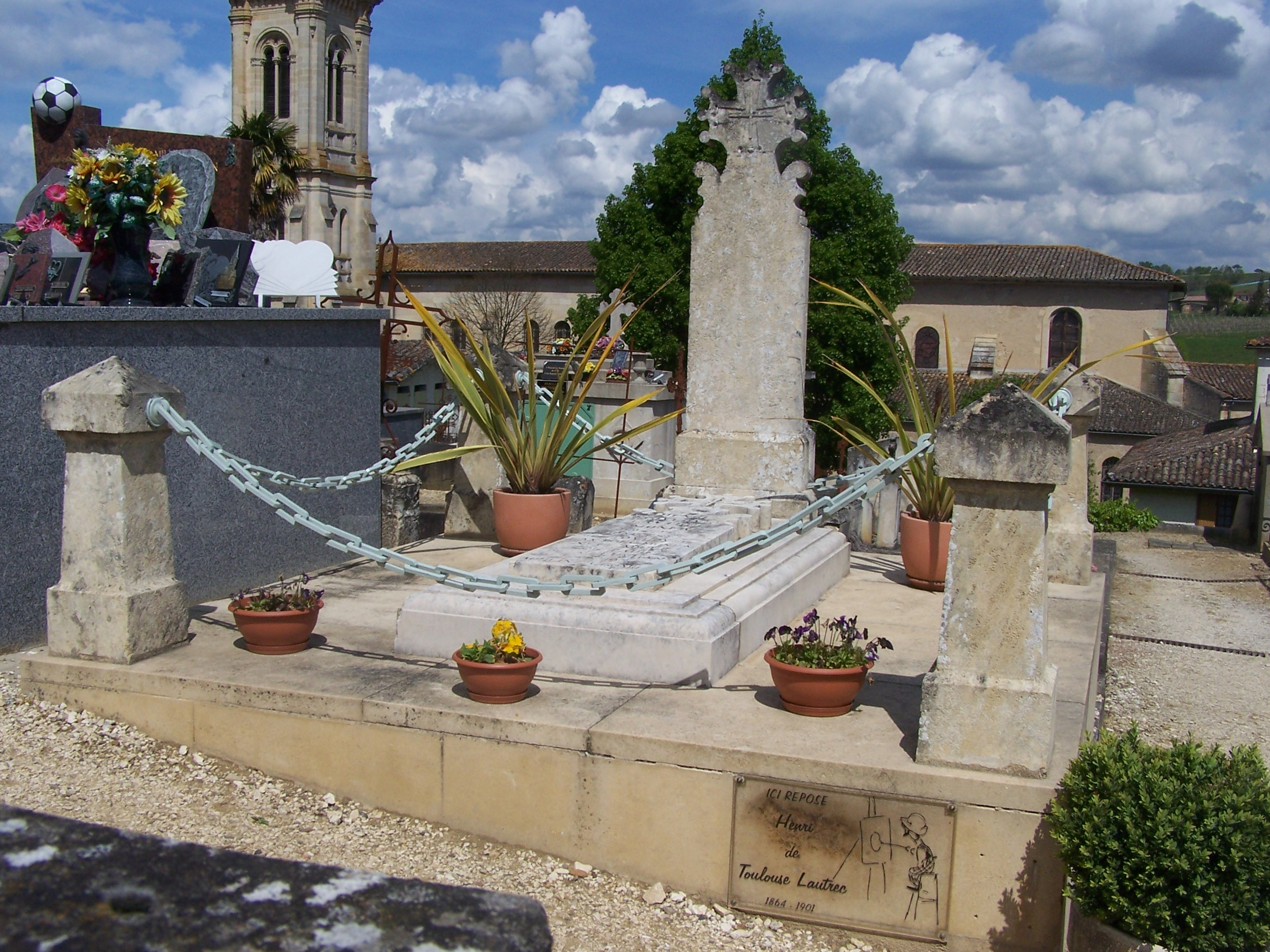
Toulouse-Lautrec's grave in Verdelais Cemetery

By February 1899, Toulouse-Lautrec's alcoholism began to take its toll, and he collapsed from exhaustion. His family had him committed to Folie Saint James, a sanatorium in Neuilly-sur-Seine for three months. While committed, he drew 39 circus portraits. After his release, he returned to the Paris studio and travelled throughout France. Both his physical and mental health began to decline due to alcoholism and syphilis.

In March 1901, a stroke left Lautrec paralysed from the legs down and confined him to a wheelchair. On 15 August 1901, whilst in Taussat, he suffered a stroke which left him hemiplegic. On 9 September 1901, at the age of 36, Toulouse-Lautrec died from complications due to alcoholism and syphilis at his mother's estate, Château Malromé, in Saint-André-du-Bois. He is buried in Verdelais Cemetery, Gironde, a few kilometres from the estate. Toulouse-Lautrec's last words reportedly were "Le vieux con!" ("The old fool!"), his goodbye to his father, who was killing a fly over his son's deathbed.

After Toulouse-Lautrec's death, his mother, Comtesse Adèle de Toulouse-Lautrec-Montfa, and his art dealer, Maurice Joyant, continued promoting his artwork. His mother contributed funds for a museum to be created in Albi, his birthplace, to show his works. The Musée Toulouse-Lautrec owns the most extensive collection of his works.

== Artworks ==
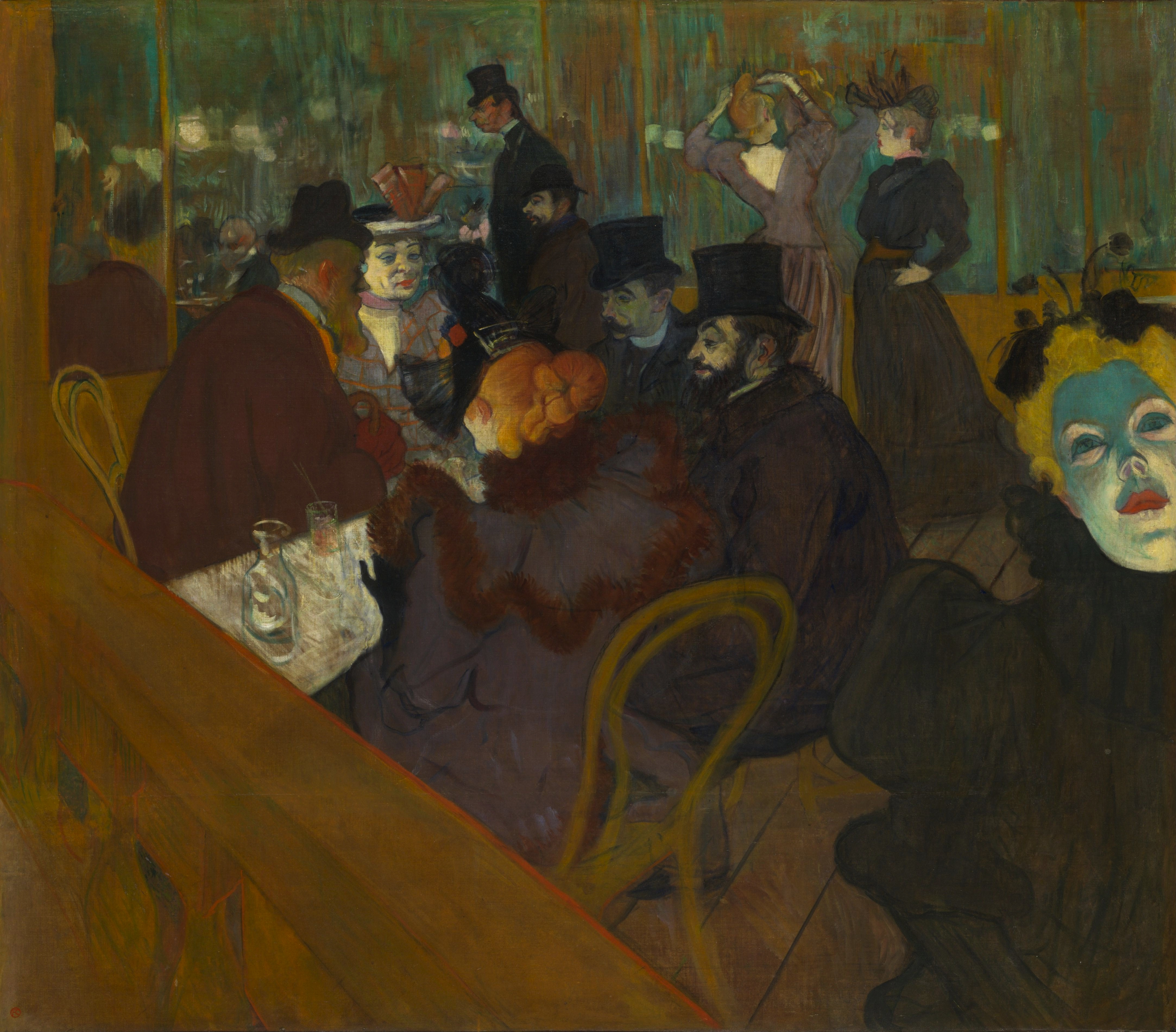
At the Moulin Rouge (1892), Art Institute of Chicago. Self-portrait in the crowd (background centre).

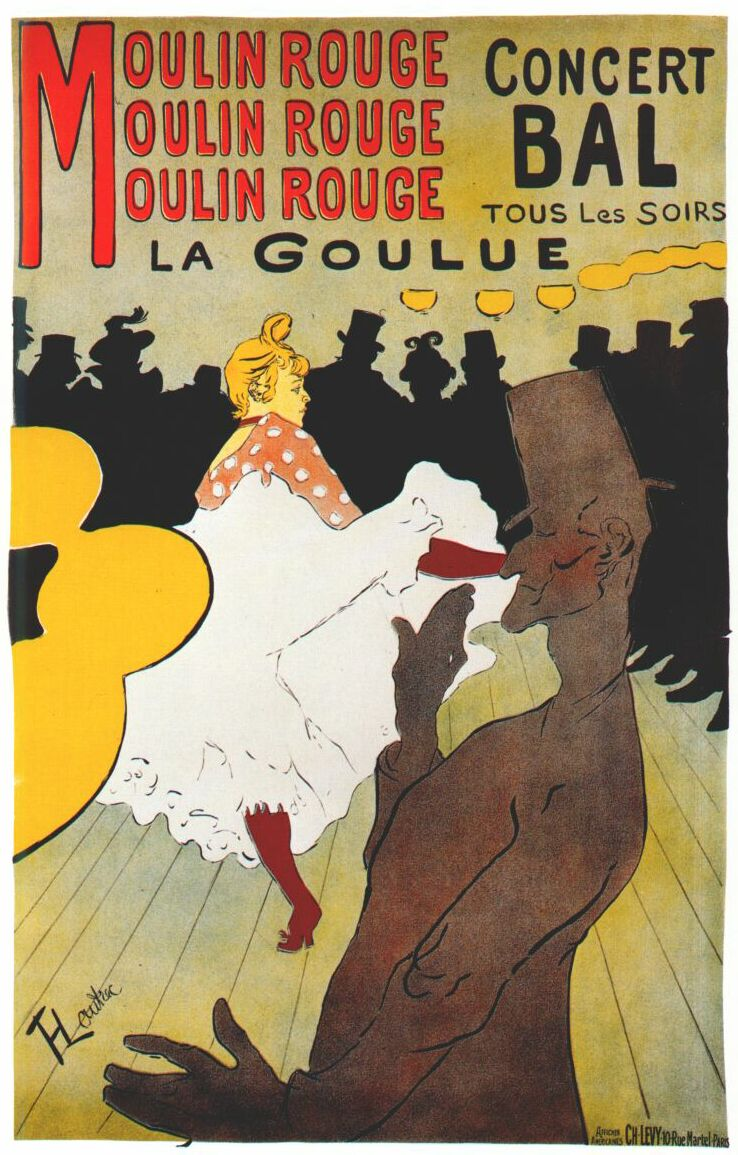
Moulin Rouge: La Goulue (1891), poster

In a career of less than 20 years, Toulouse-Lautrec created:

- 737 paintings on canvas
- 275 watercolours
- 363 prints and posters
- 5,084 drawings
- some ceramic and stained-glass work
- an unknown (80+) number of lost works

=== Style ===
Toulouse-Lautrec's debt to the Impressionists, particularly the more figurative painters like Manet and Degas, is apparent, that within his works, one can draw parallels to the detached barmaid at A Bar at the Folies-Bergère by Manet and the behind-the-scenes ballet dancers of Degas. Toulouse-Lautrec's style was also influenced by the ukiyo-e genre (Japanese woodblock prints), which became popular in the Parisian art world.

Toulouse-Lautrec excelled at depicting people in their working environments, with the colour and movement of the gaudy nightlife present but the glamour stripped away. He was a master at painting crowd scenes where each figure was highly individualised. At the time they were painted, the individual figures in his larger paintings could be identified by silhouette alone, and the names of many of these characters have been recorded. His treatment of his subject matter, whether as portraits, in scenes of Parisian nightlife, or as intimate studies, has been described as alternately "sympathetic" and "dispassionate".

Toulouse-Lautrec's skilled depiction of people relied on his highly linear approach emphasising contours. He often applied paint in long, thin brushstrokes leaving much of the board visible. Many of his works may be best described as "drawings in coloured paint."

=== Selected works ===
See also Category:Paintings by Henri de Toulouse-Lautrec.

==== Paintings ====
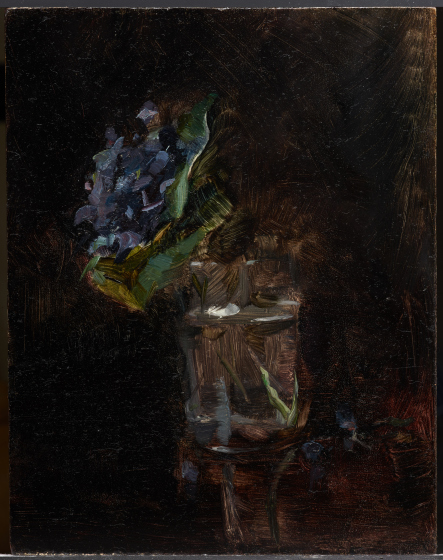
Bouquet of violets in a vase (1882), oil on panel, Dallas Museum of Art

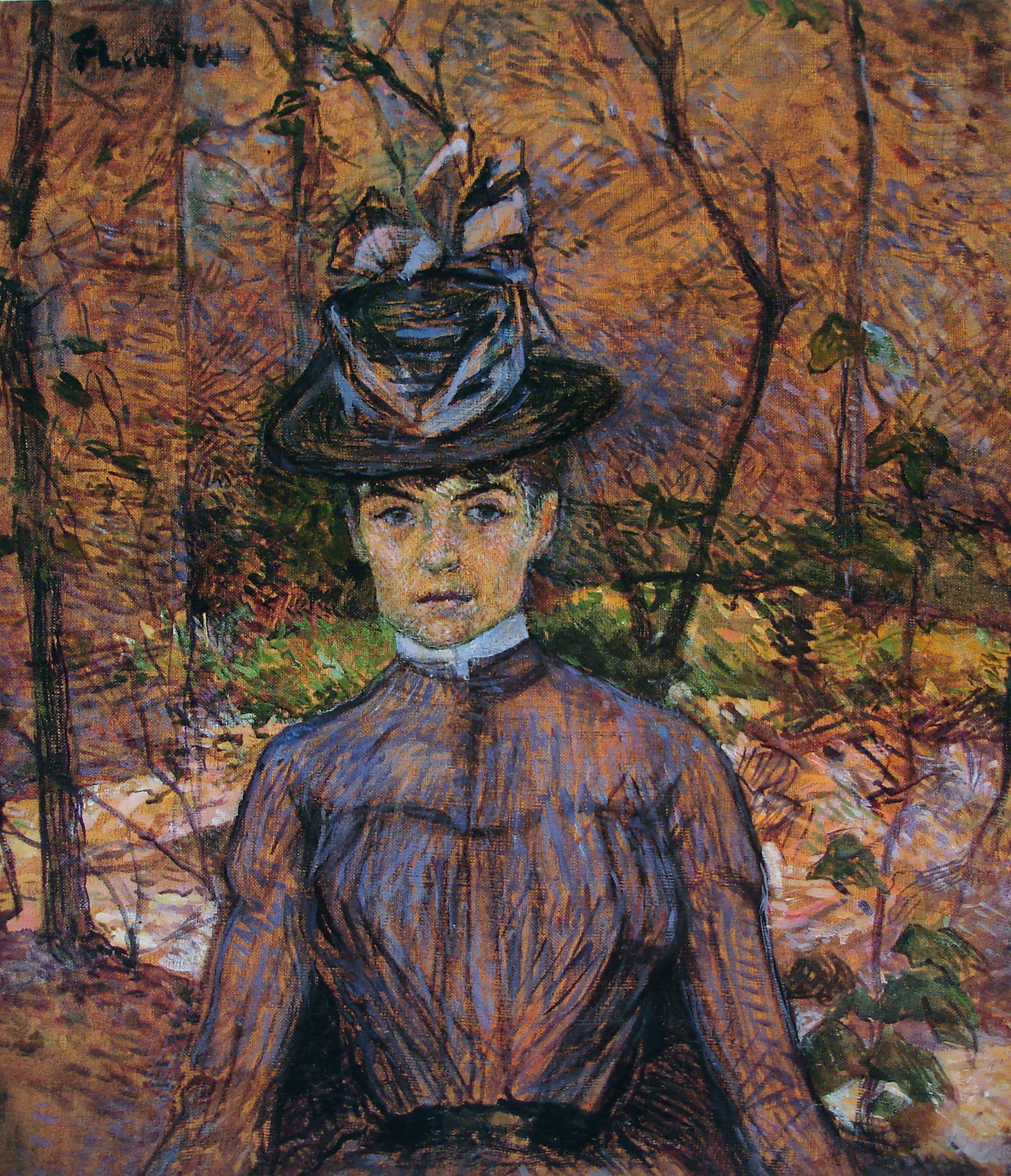
Portrait de Suzanne Valadon (1885), oil on canvas, Museo Nacional de Bellas Artes Buenos Aires

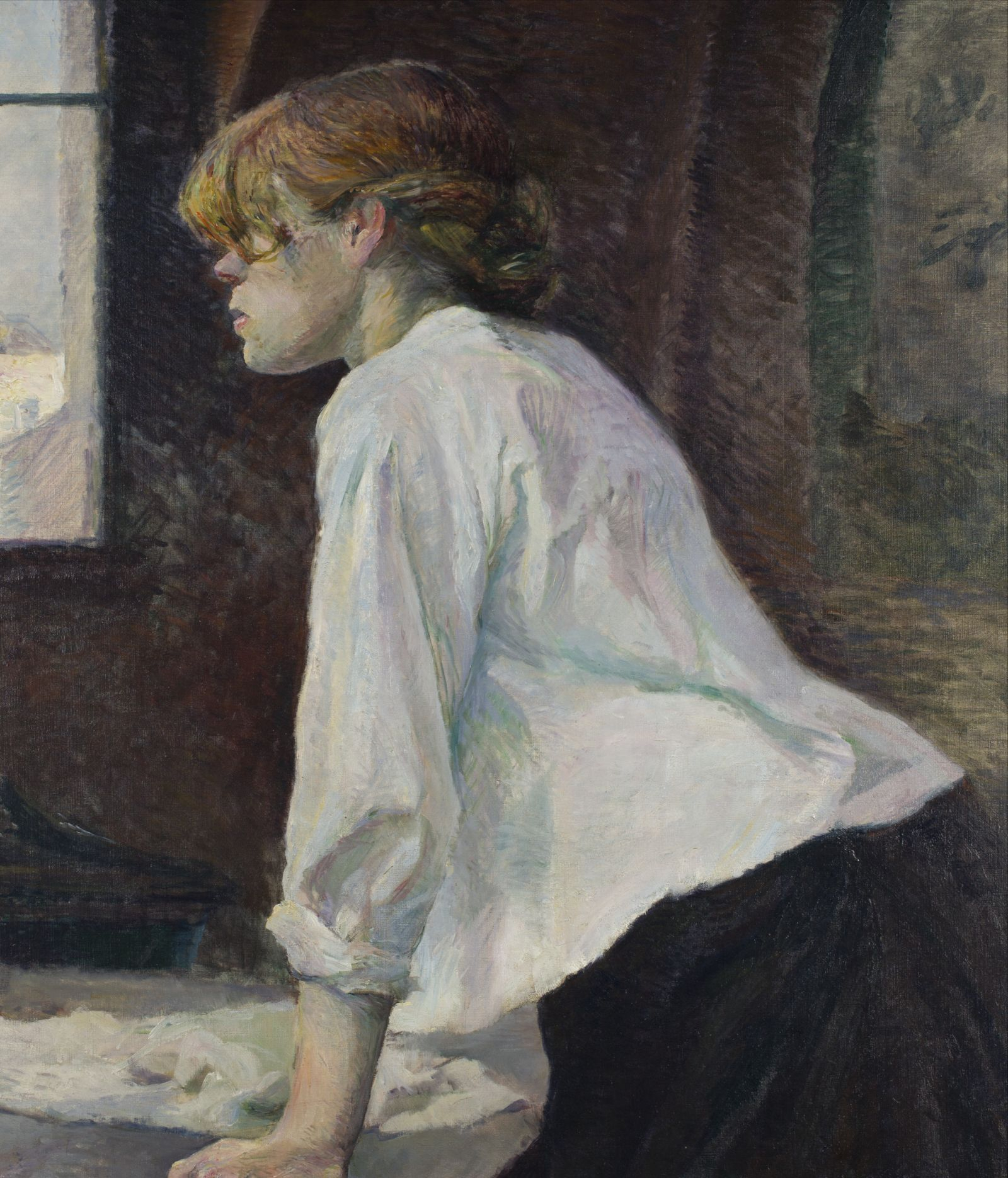
The Laundress (1884–1888), oil on canvas, private collection

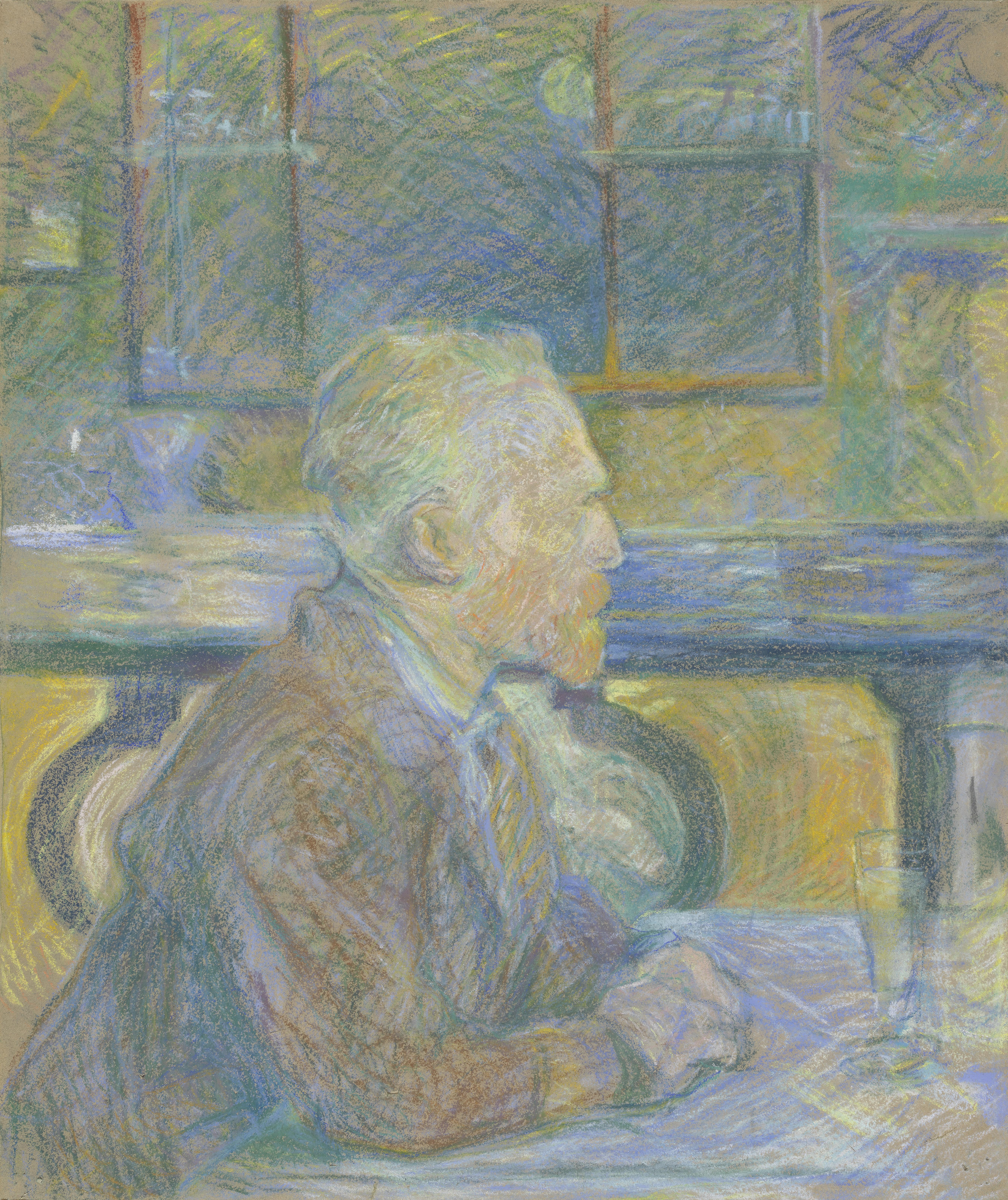
Portrait of Vincent van Gogh (1887, pastel on cardboard, Van Gogh Museum

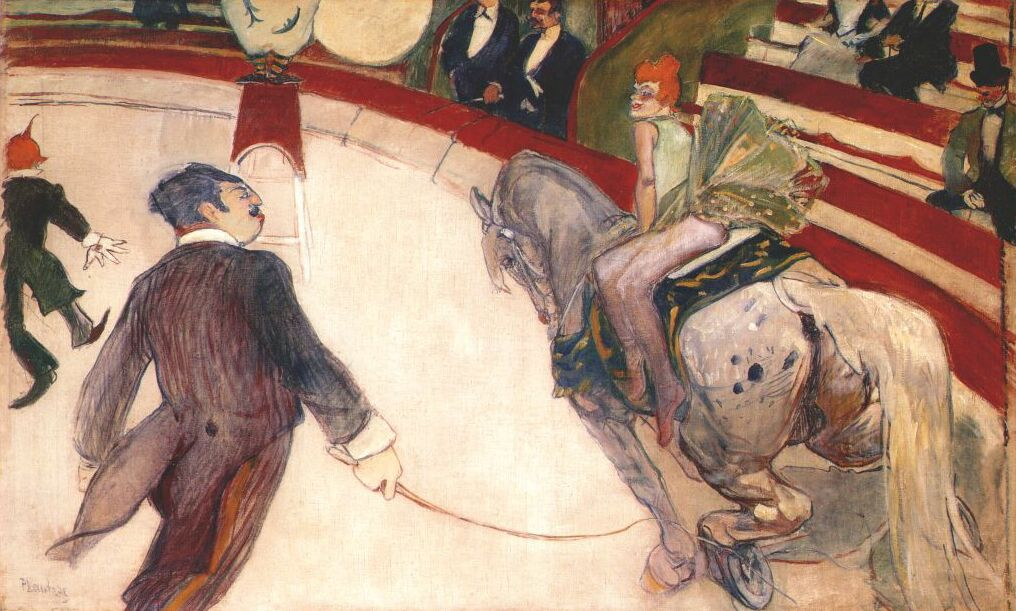
Équestrienne (At the Circus Fernando) (1888), oil on canvas, Art Institute of Chicago

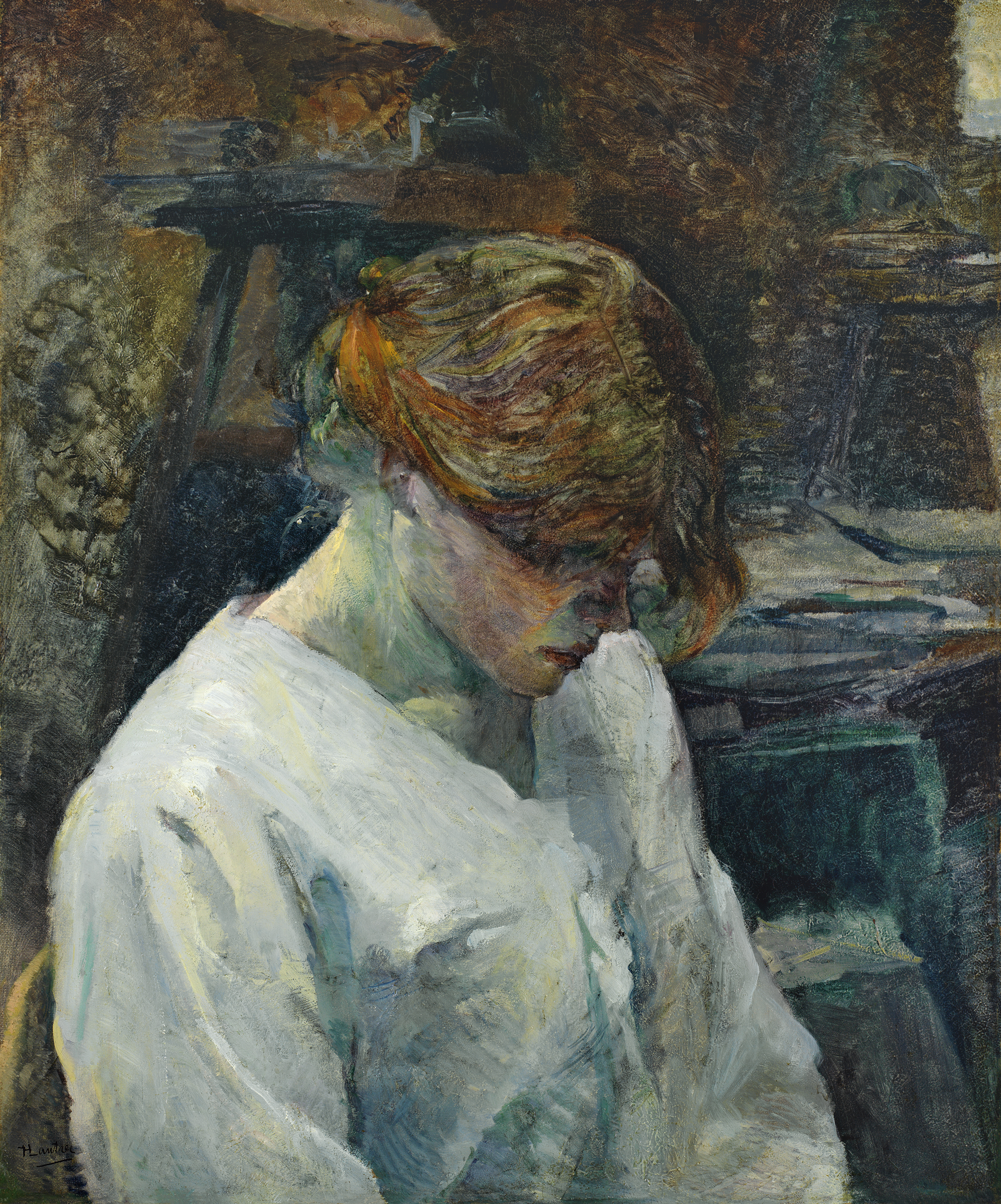
La Rousse in a White Blouse (1889), oil on canvas, Thyssen-Bornemisza Museum

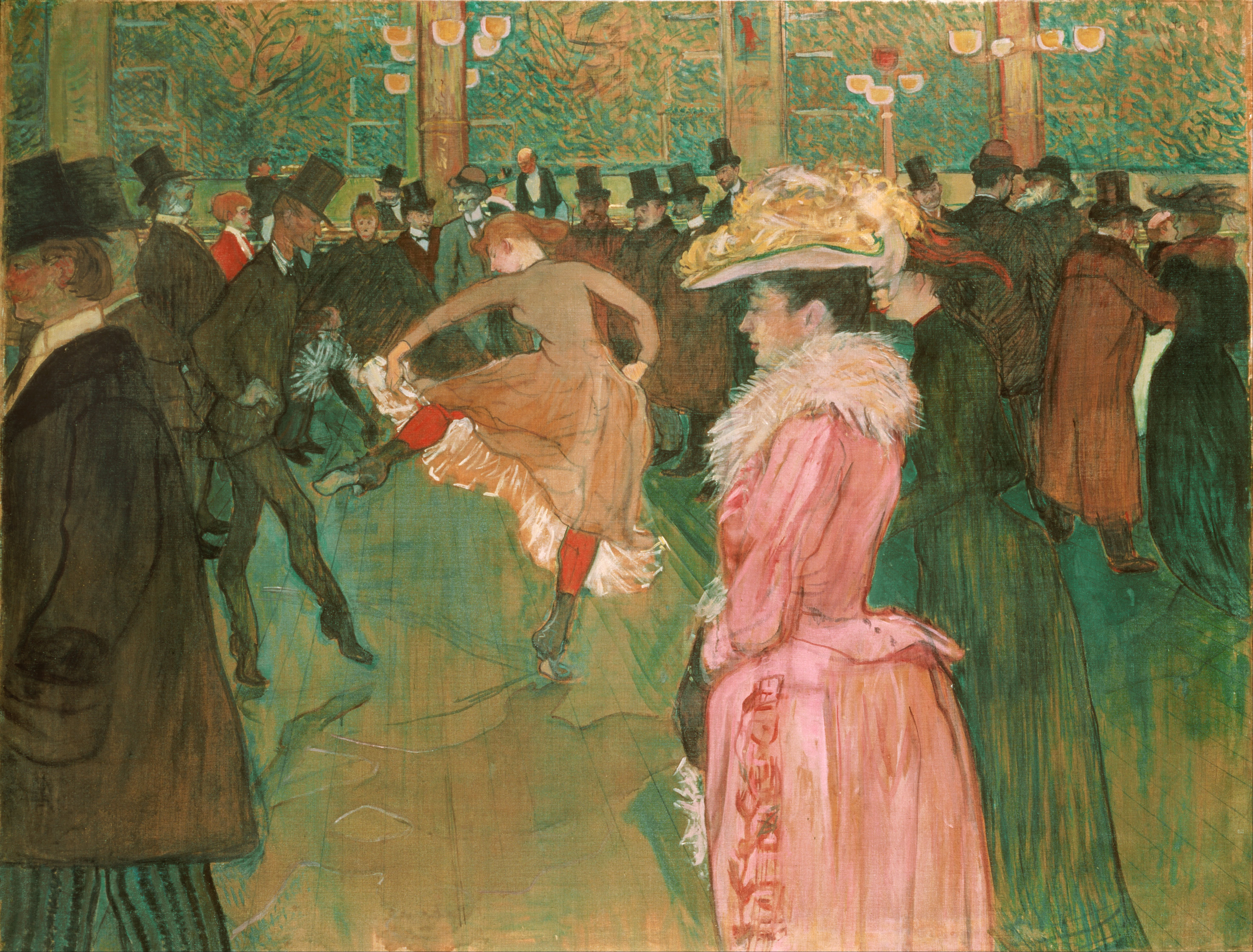
At the Moulin Rouge, The Dance (1890), oil on canvas, Philadelphia Museum of Art

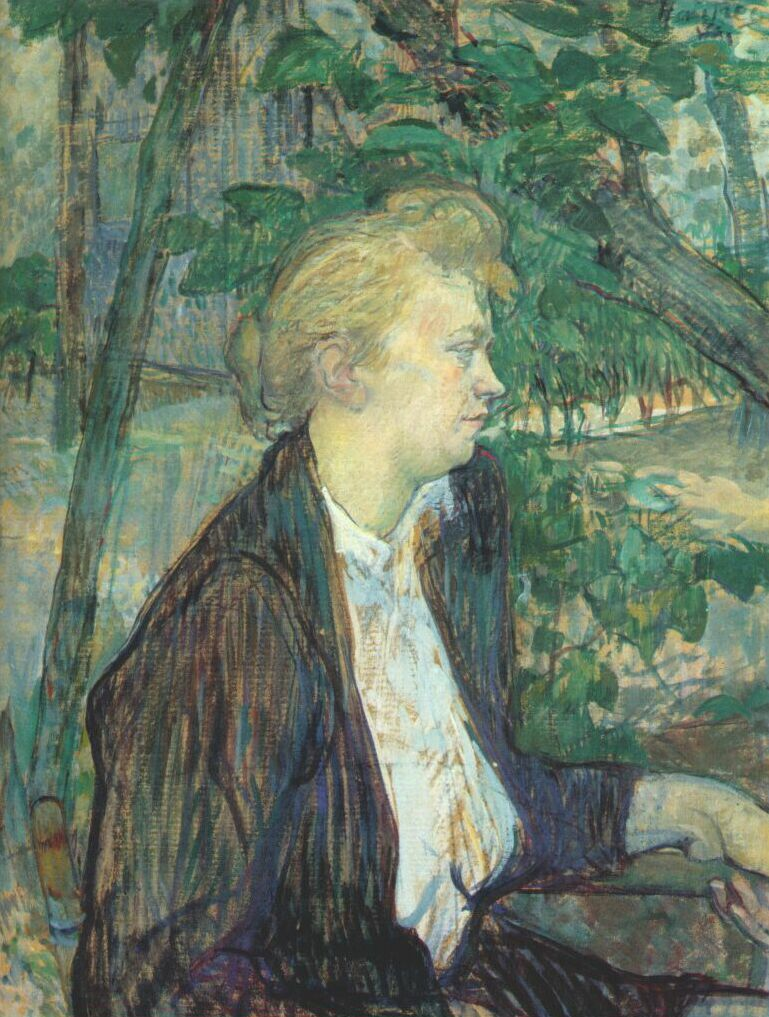
Portrait of Gabrielle (1891), oil on cardboard, Museum Toulouse-Lautrec

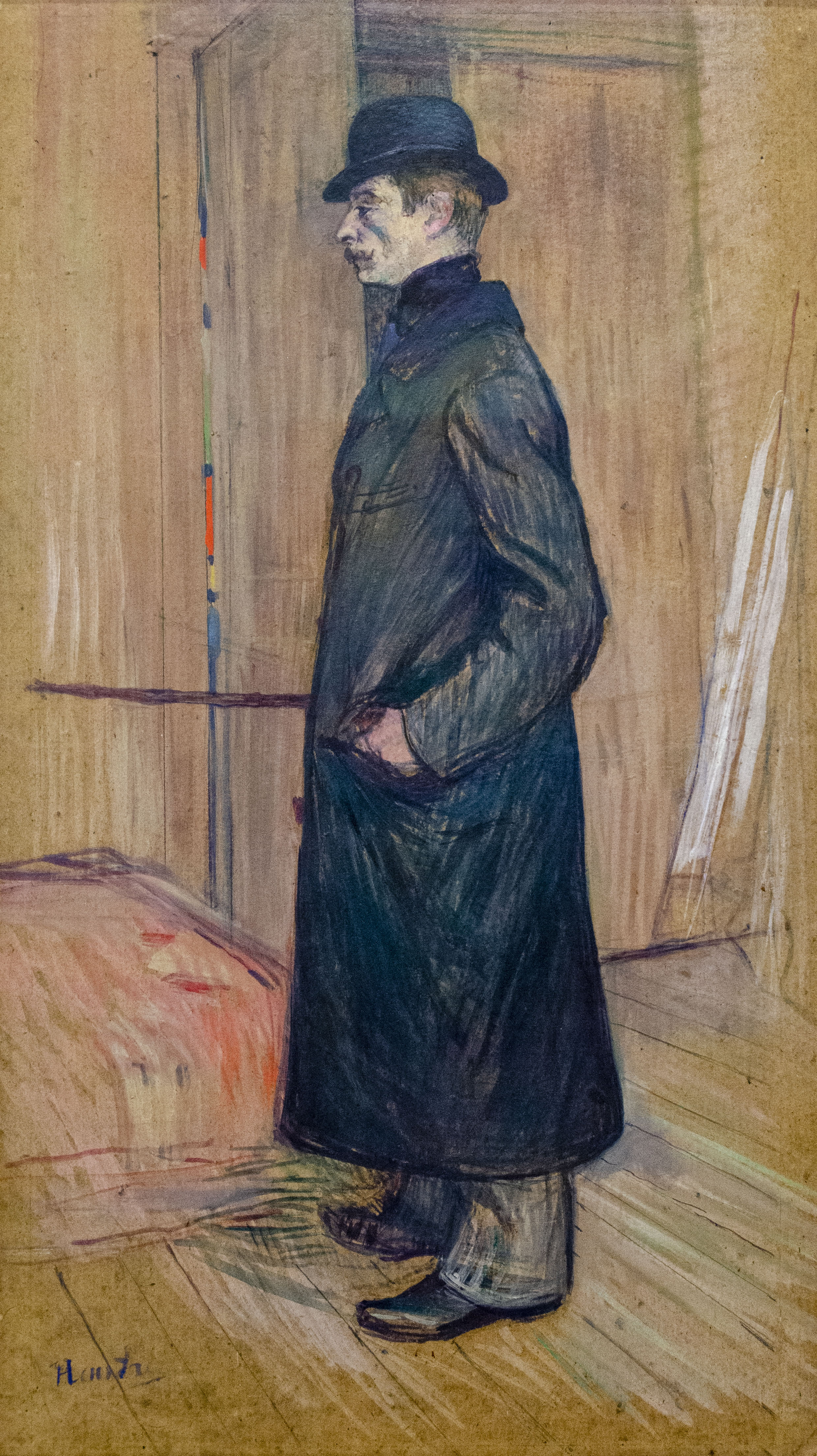
Portrait of Gaston Bonnefoy (1891), oil on cardboard, Thyssen-Bornemisza Museum

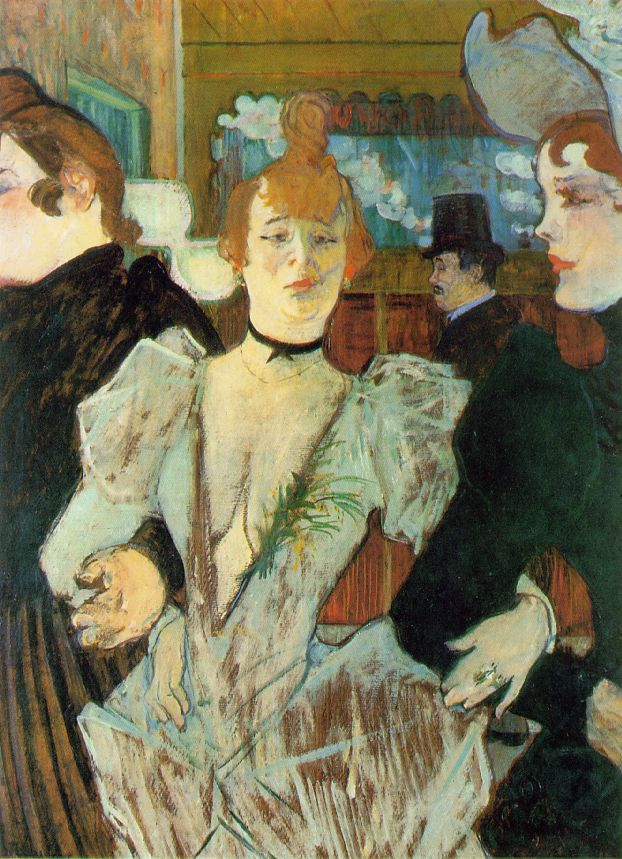
La Goulue arriving at the Moulin Rouge (1892), oil on cardboard, Museum of Modern Art New York

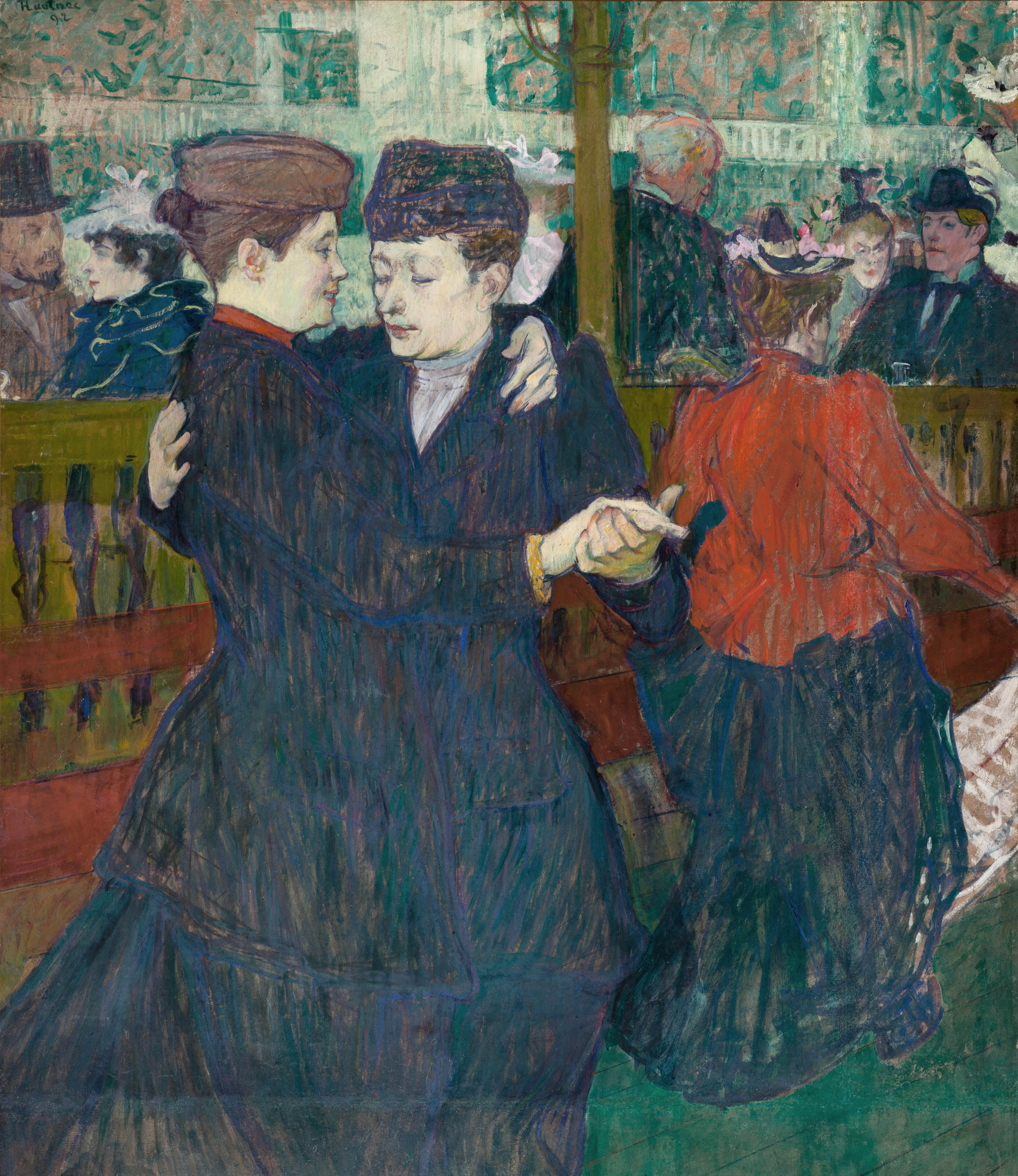
At the Moulin Rouge (Two Women Waltzing) (1892), oil on cardboard, National Gallery in Prague

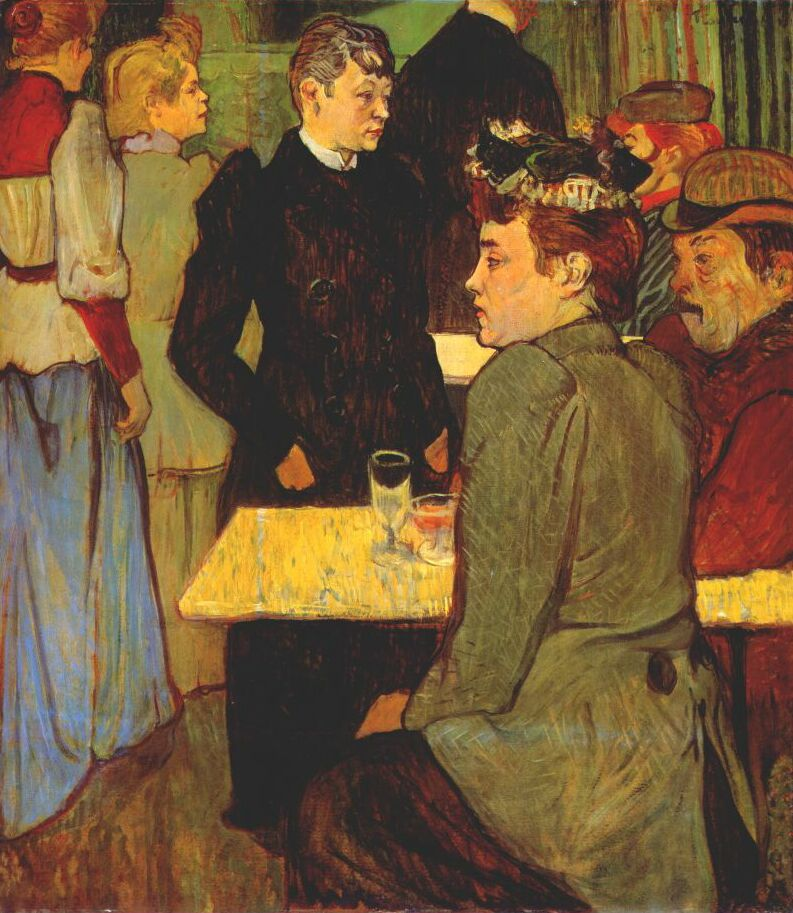
Un coin du Moulin de la Galette (1892), National Gallery of Art Washington

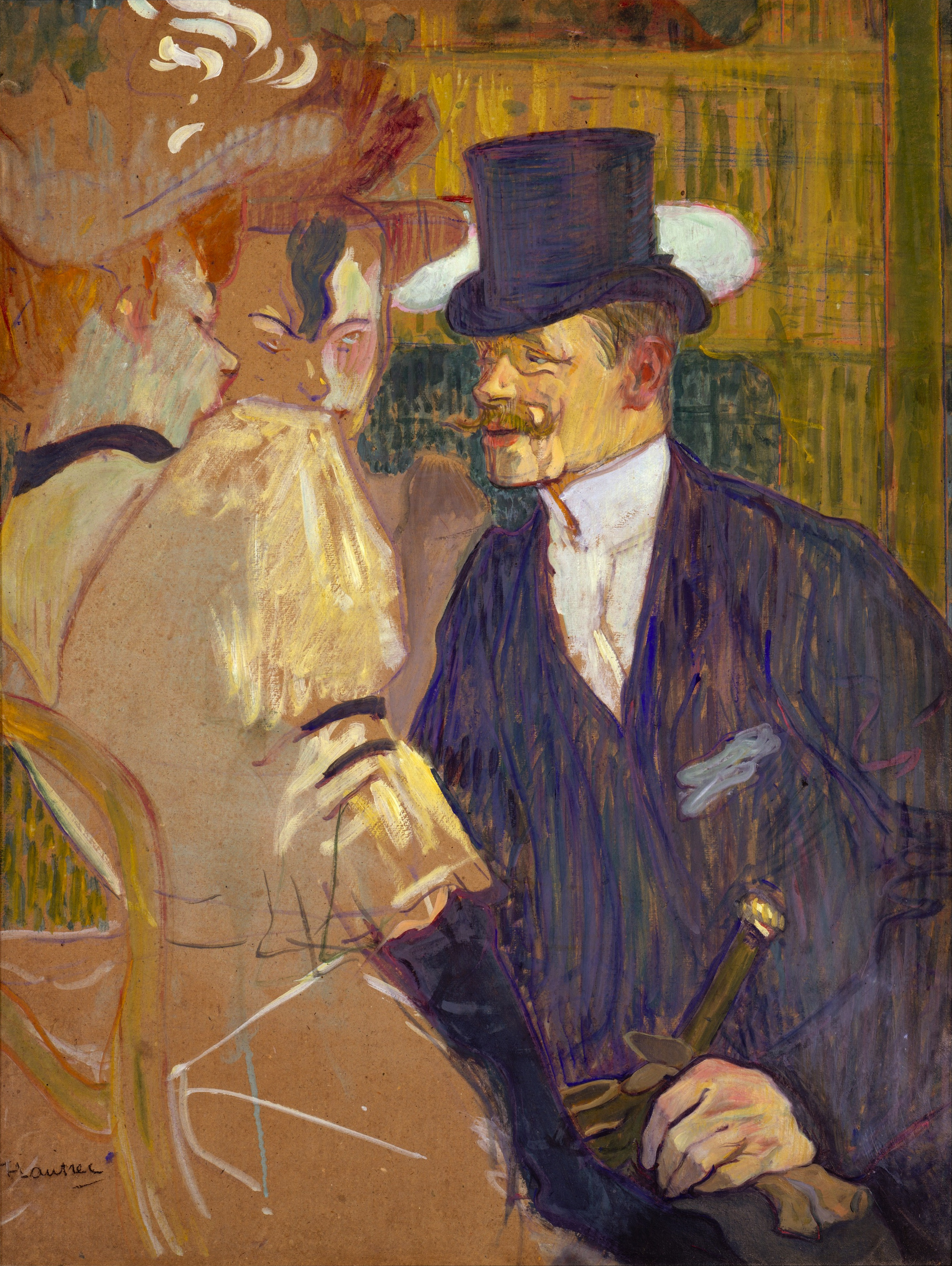
The Englishman at the Moulin Rouge (1892), oil on cardboard, Metropolitan Museum of Art

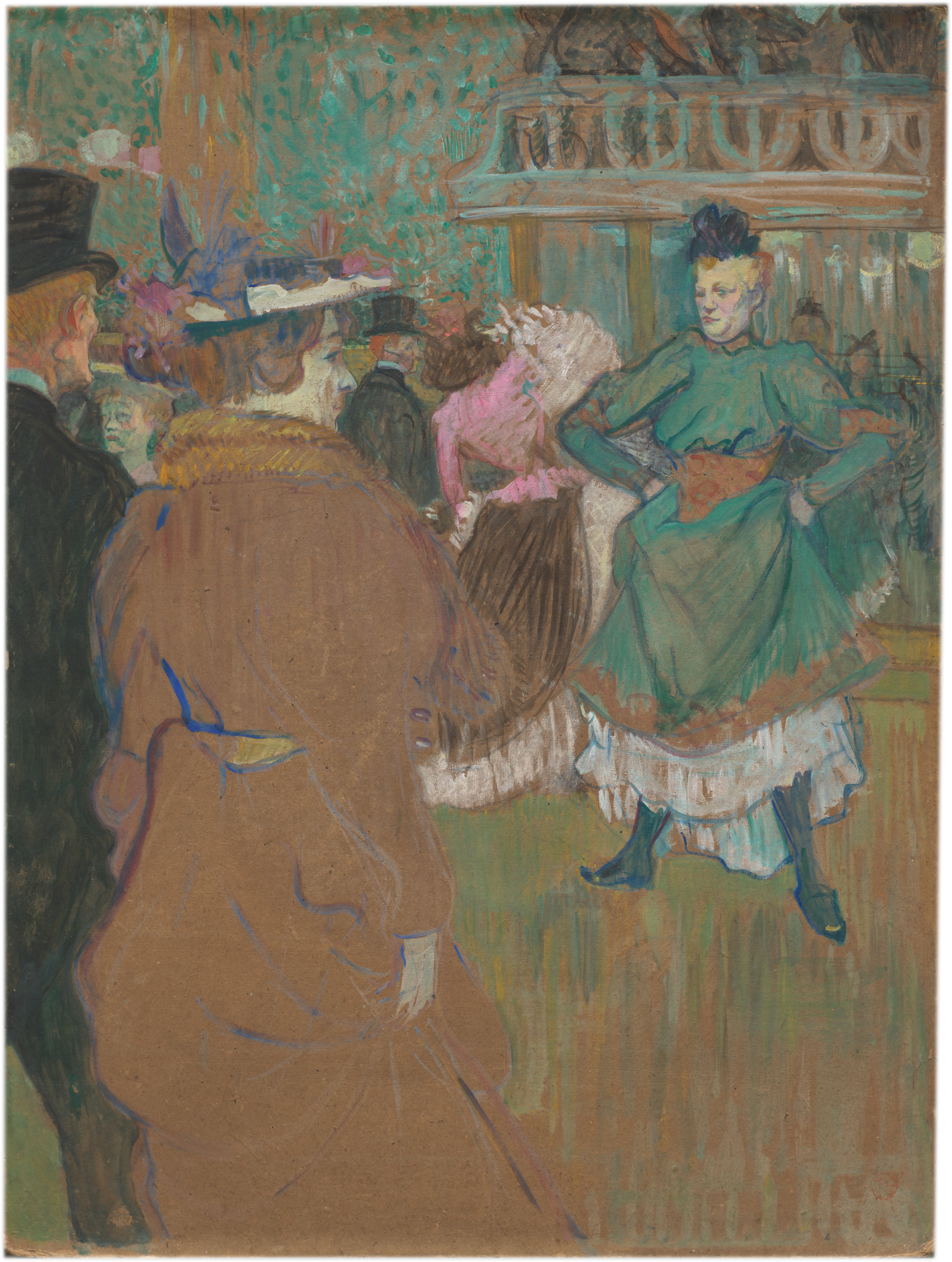
Quadrille at the Moulin Rouge (1892), oil and gouache on cardboard, National Gallery of Art Washington

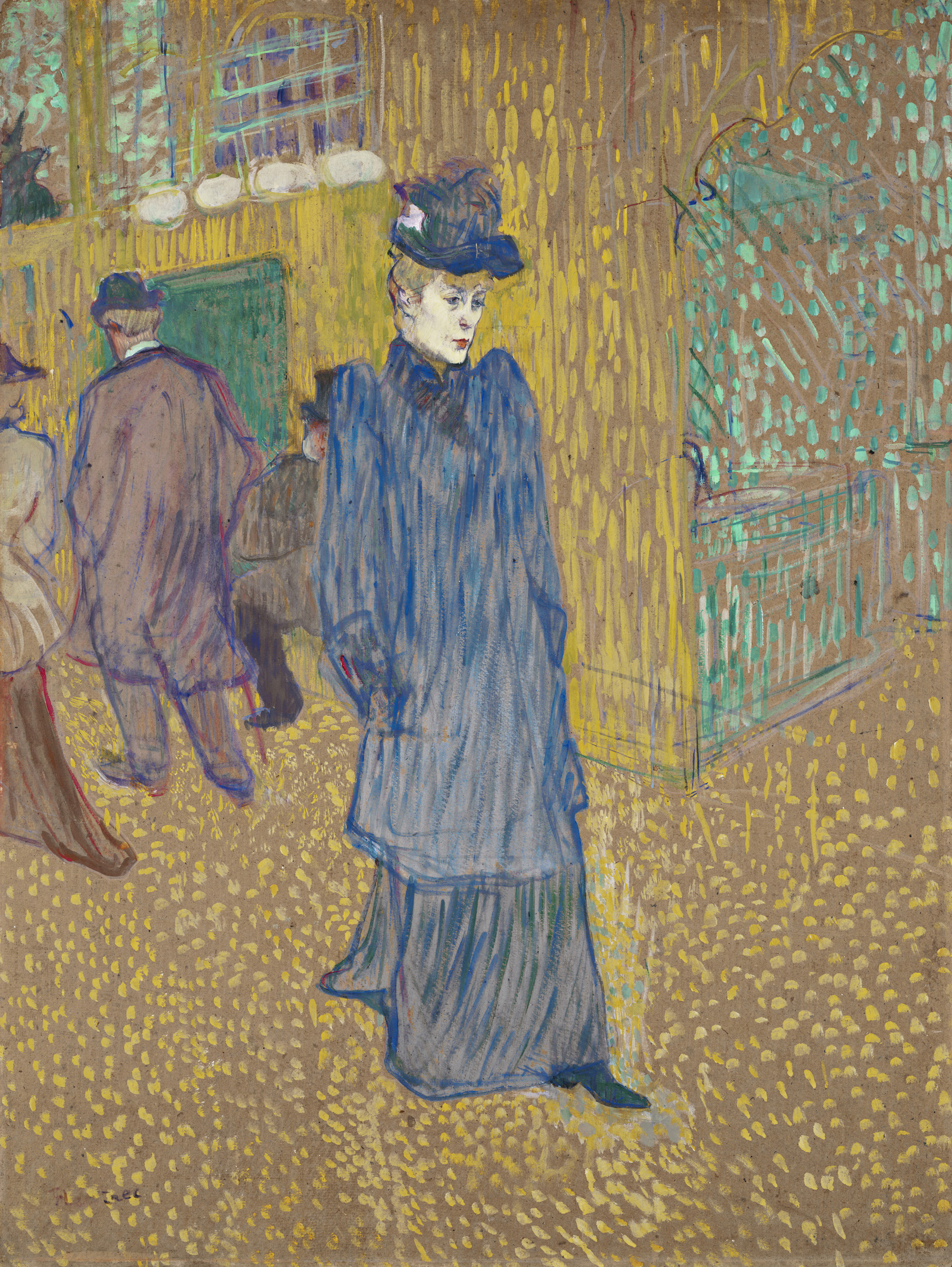
Jane Avril leaving the Moulin Rouge (c. 1892), oil and gouache on cardboard, Wadsworth Atheneum Museum of Art

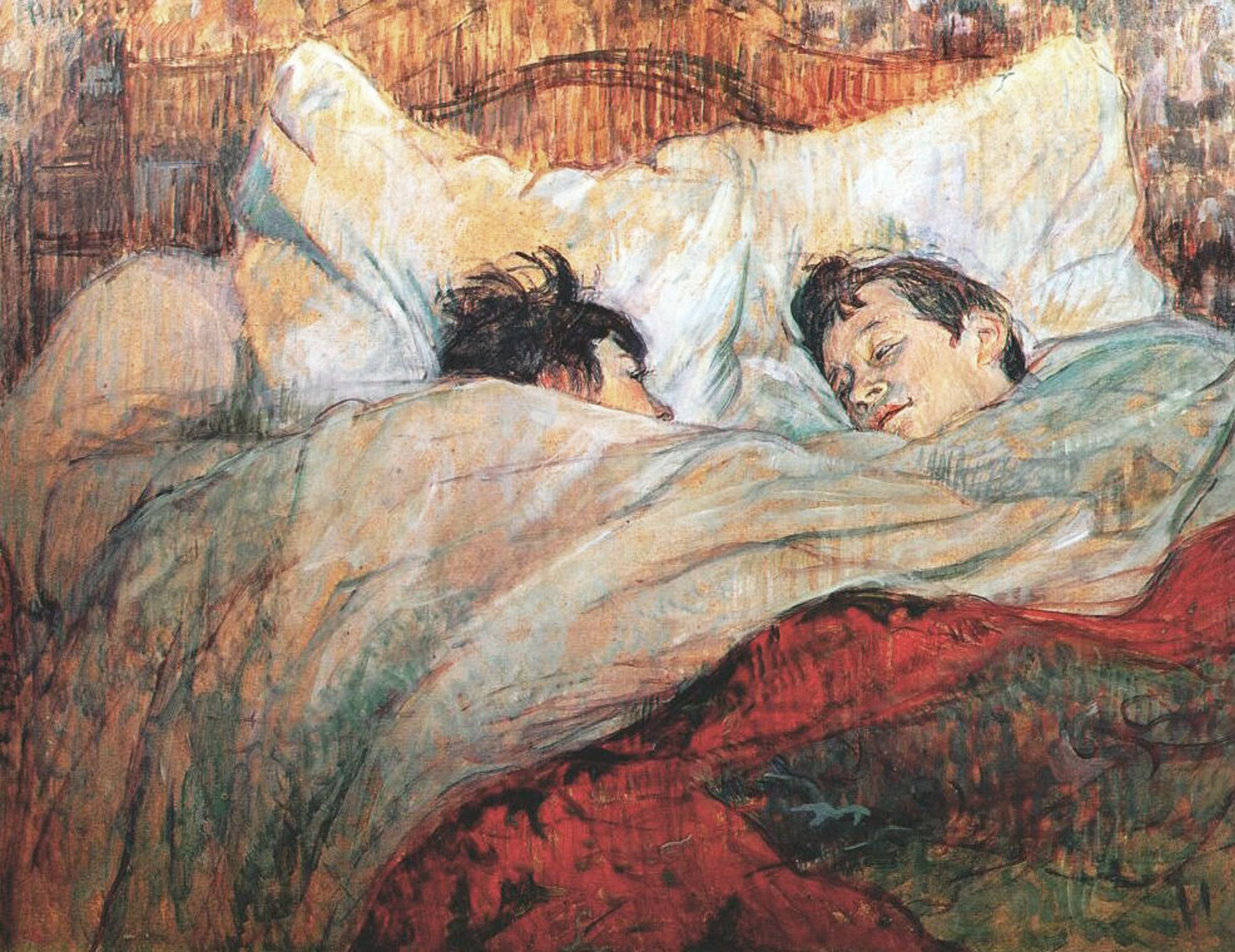
In Bed (1893), oil on cardboard, Musée d'Orsay

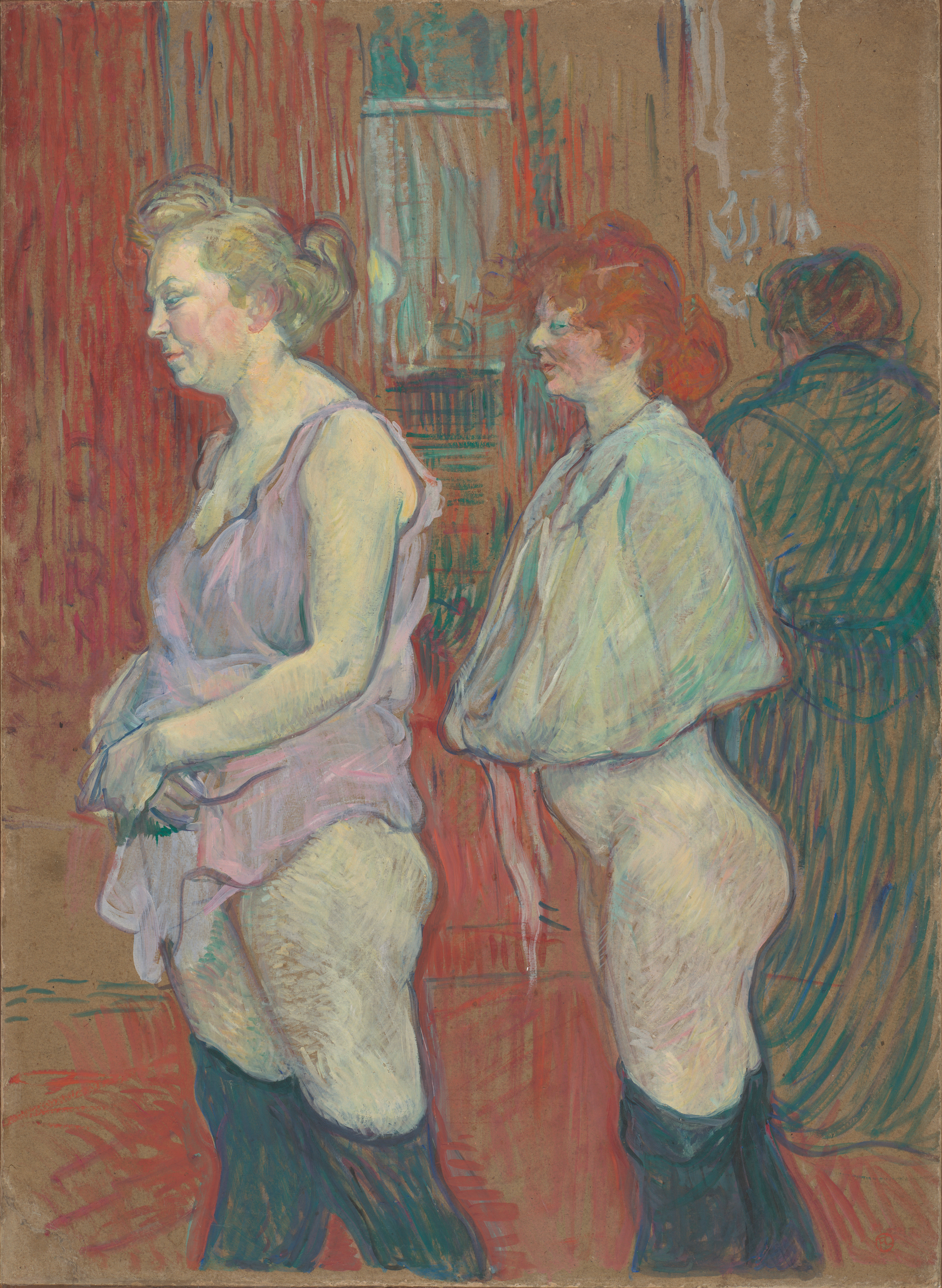
The Medical Inspection at the Rue des Moulins Brothel (1894), oil on cardboard on wood, National Gallery of Art Washington

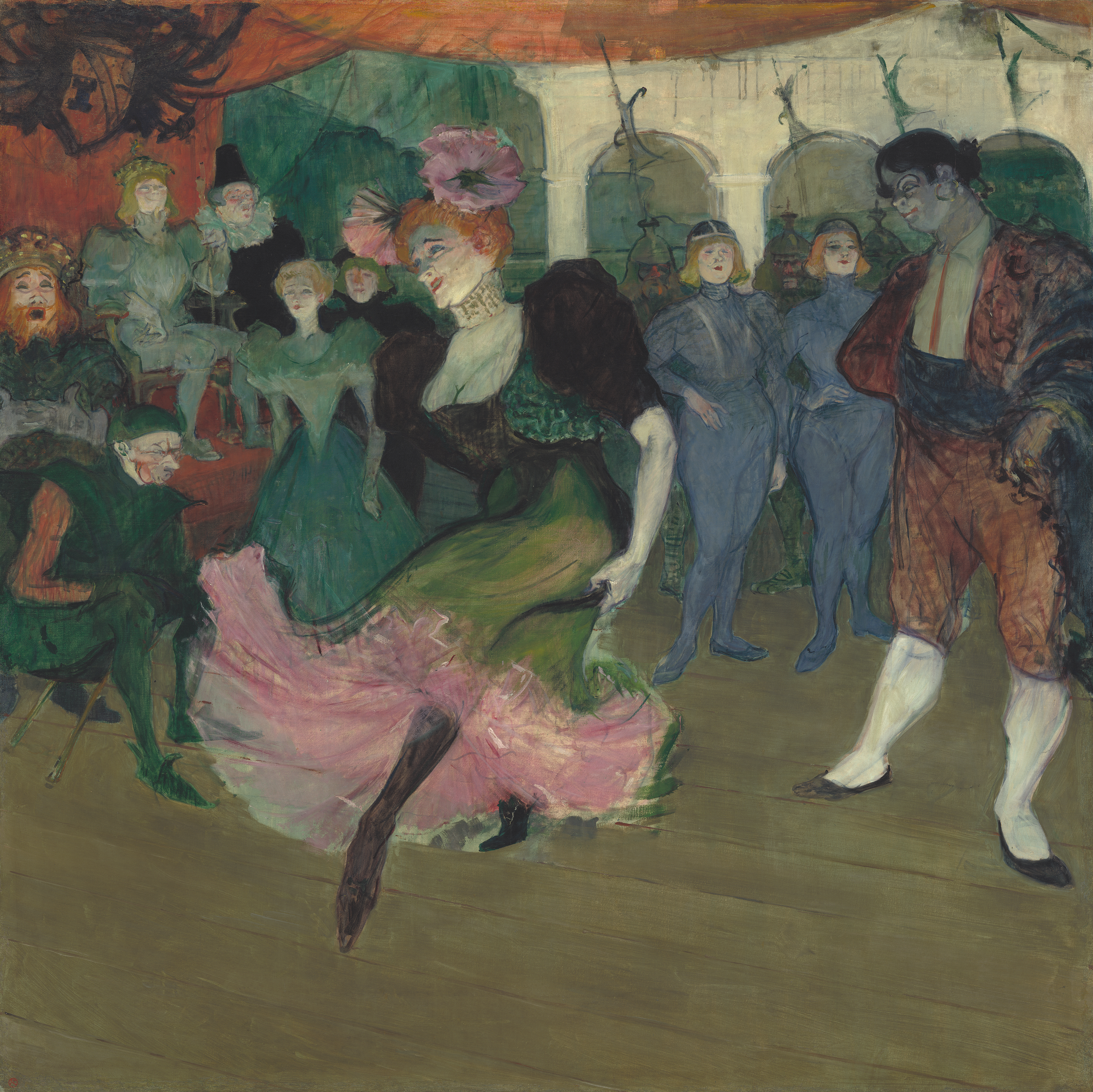
Marcelle Lender Dancing the Bolero in "Chilpéric" (1895–96), oil on canvas, National Gallery of Art Washington

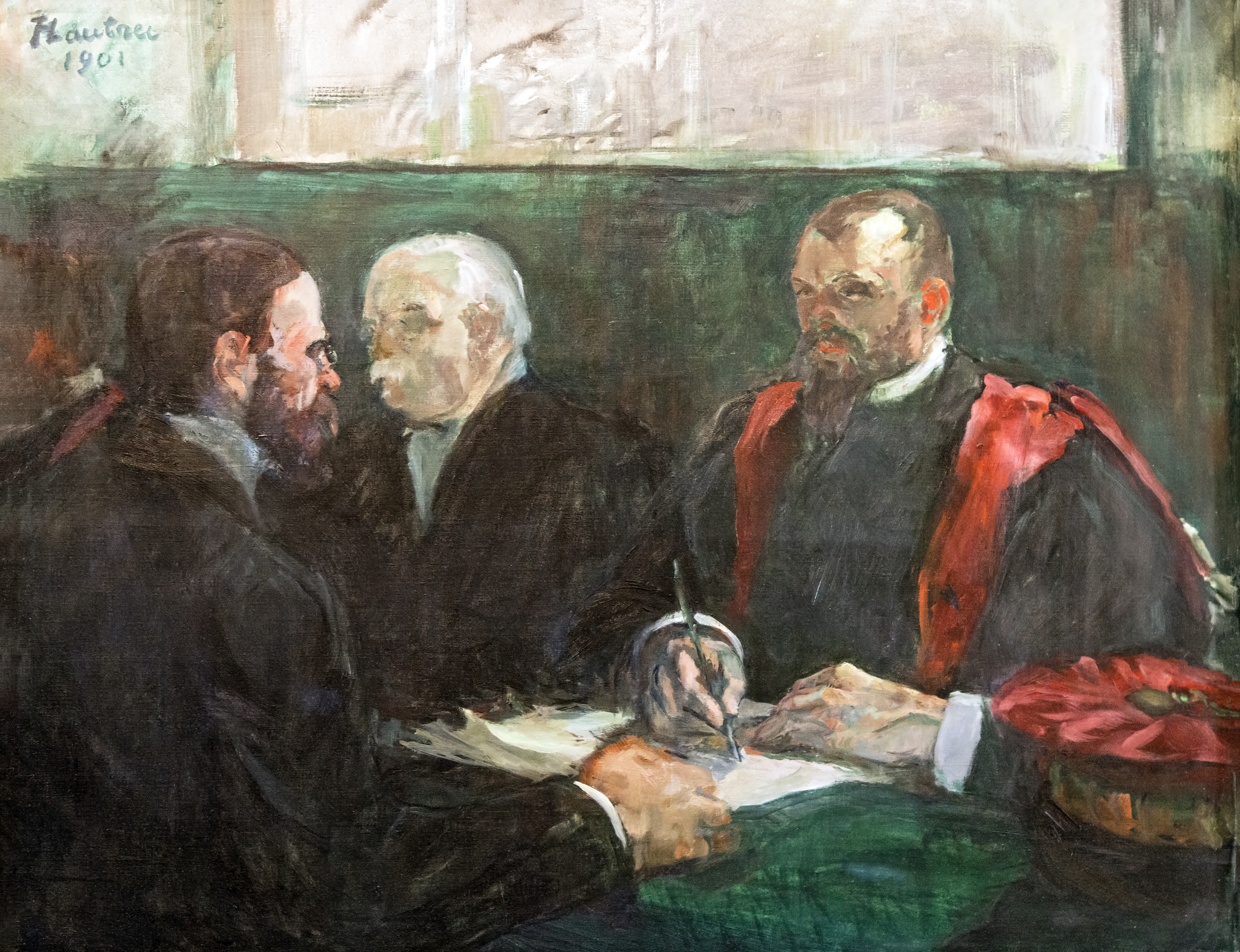
Examination at faculty of medicine (May–July 1901), oil on canvas – his last painting, Museum Toulouse-Lautrec

==== Posters ====
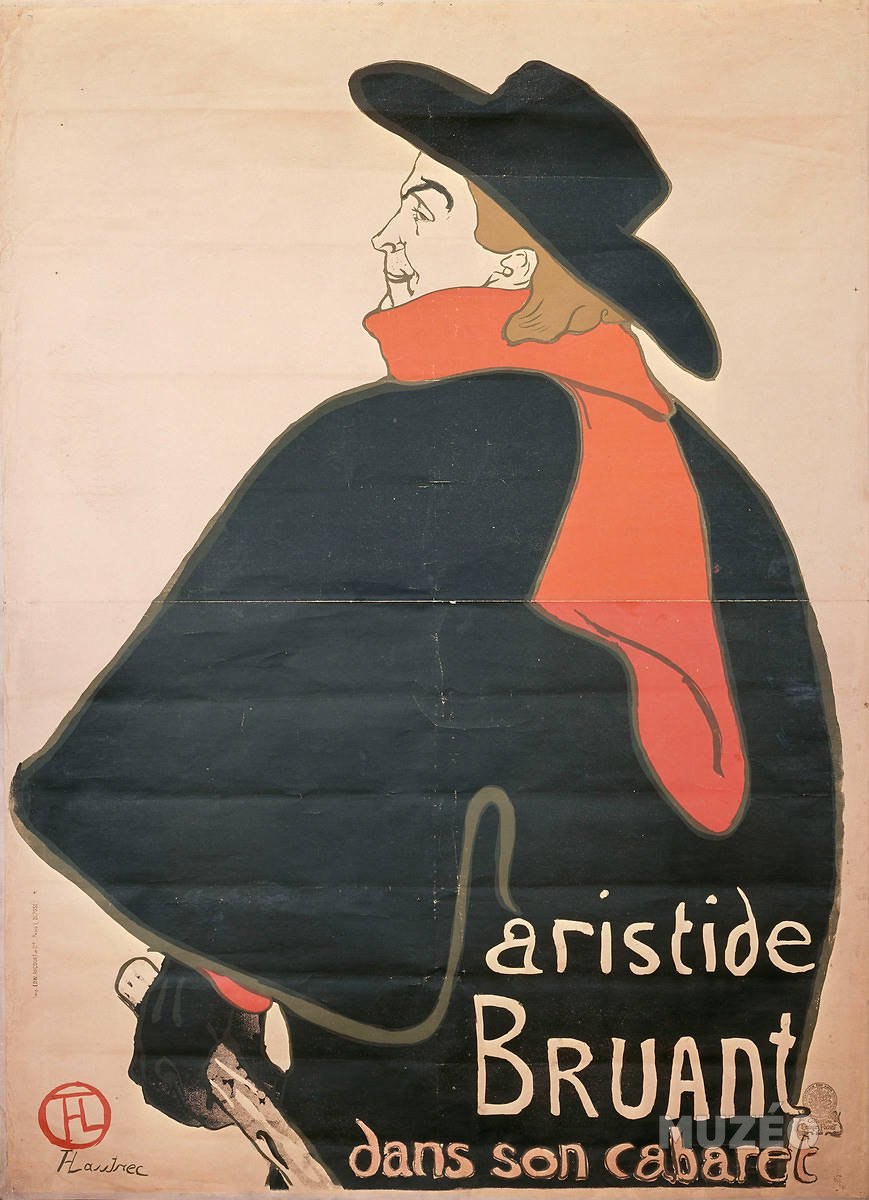
Aristide Bruant in his cabaret (1892), lithograph

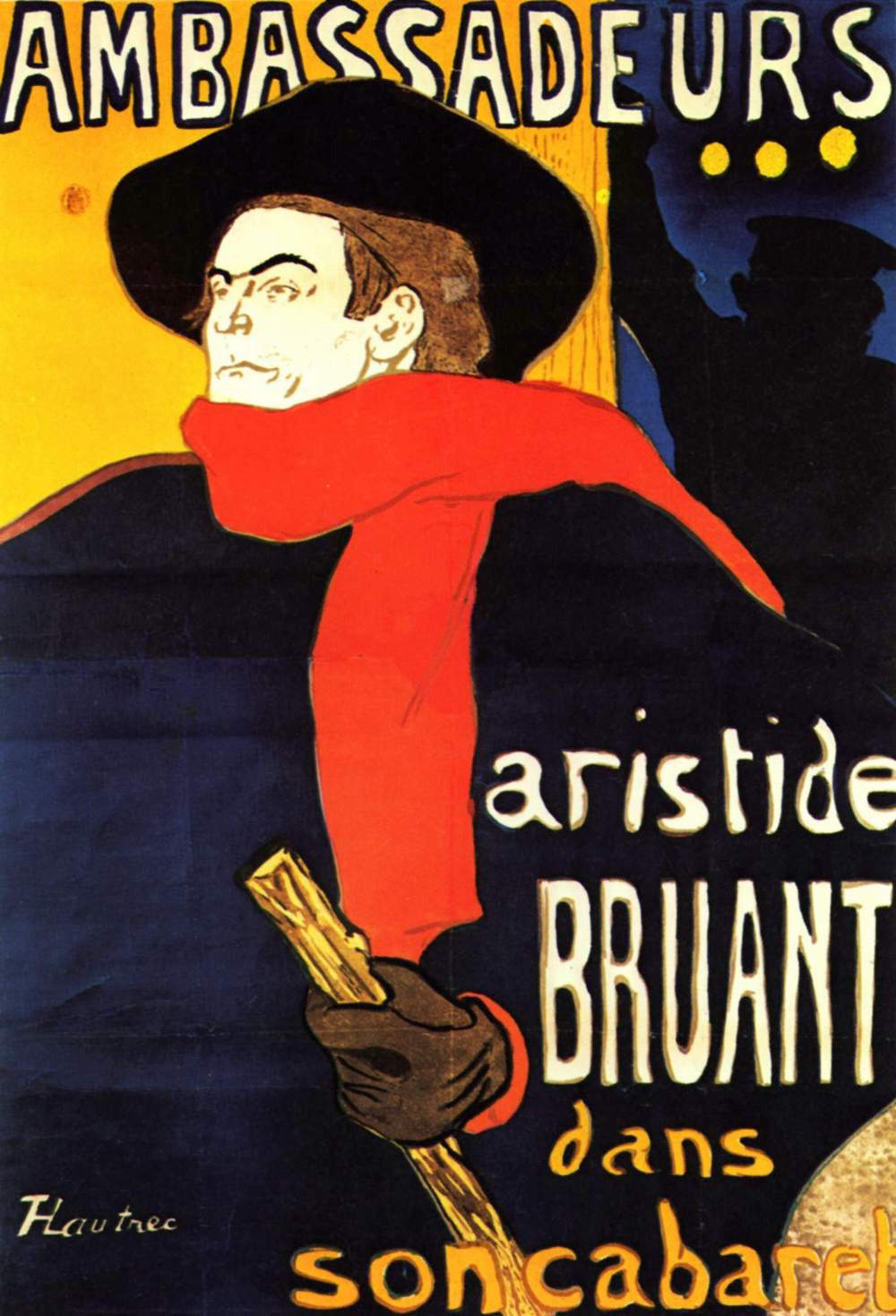
Ambassadeurs – Aristide Bruant (1892), lithograph

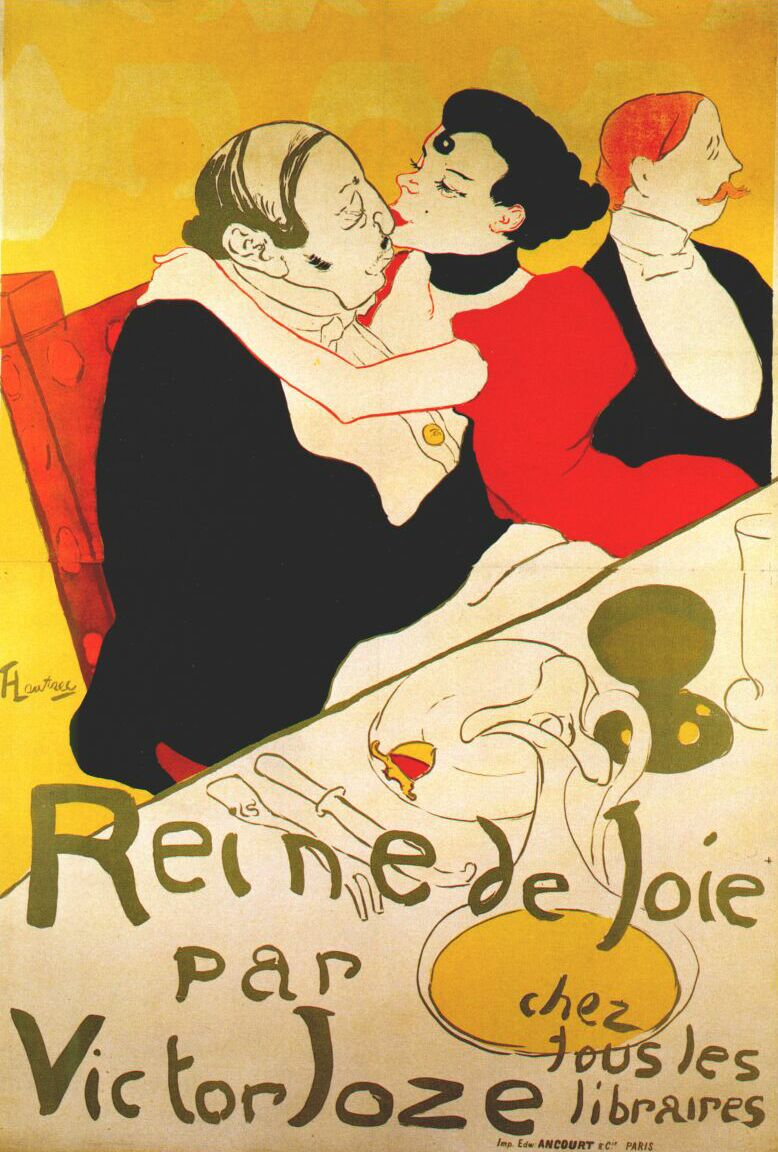
Reine de Joie (1892), chromolithograph

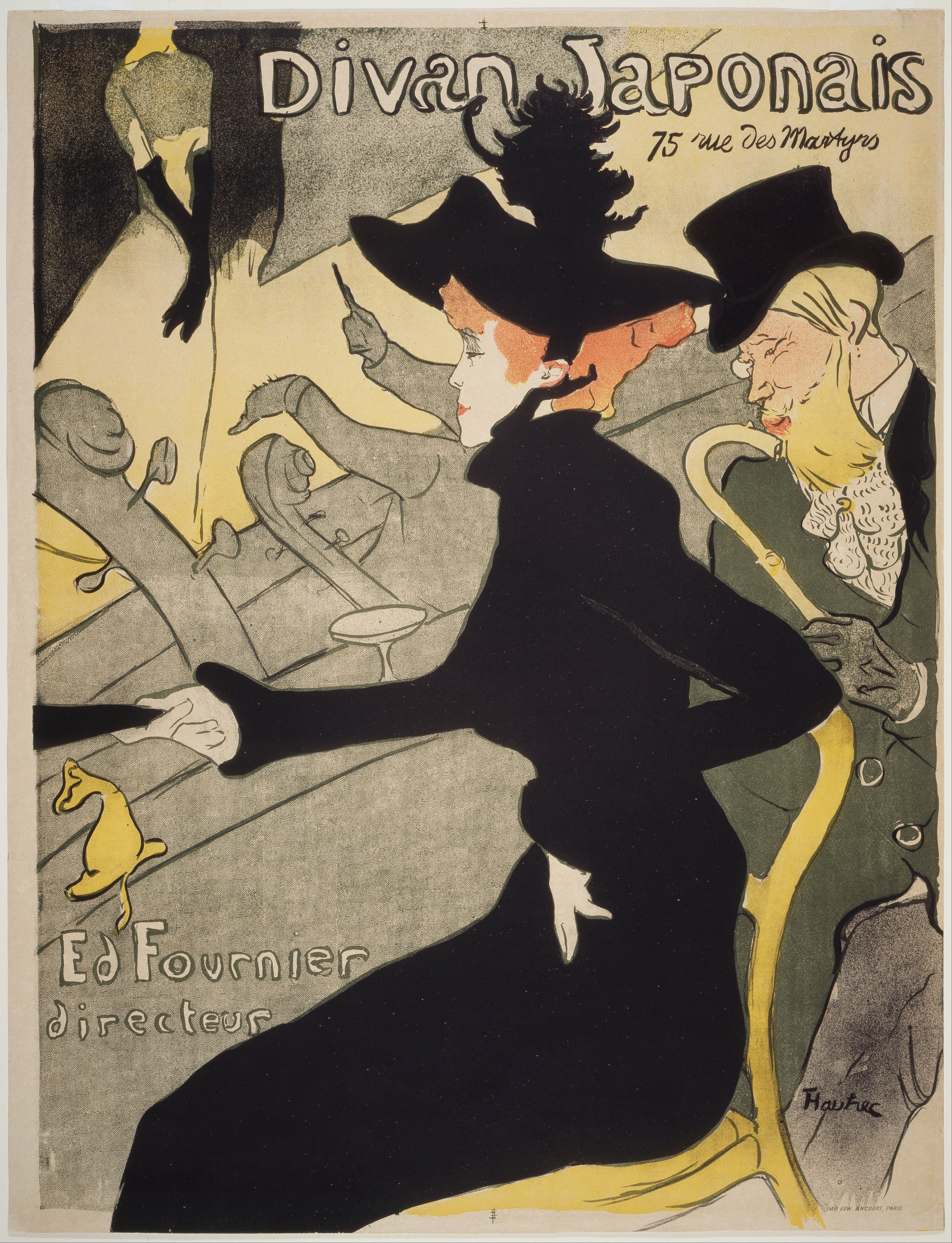
Divan Japonais (1892–93), crayon, brush, spatter and transferred screen lithograph, printed in 4 colour-layers

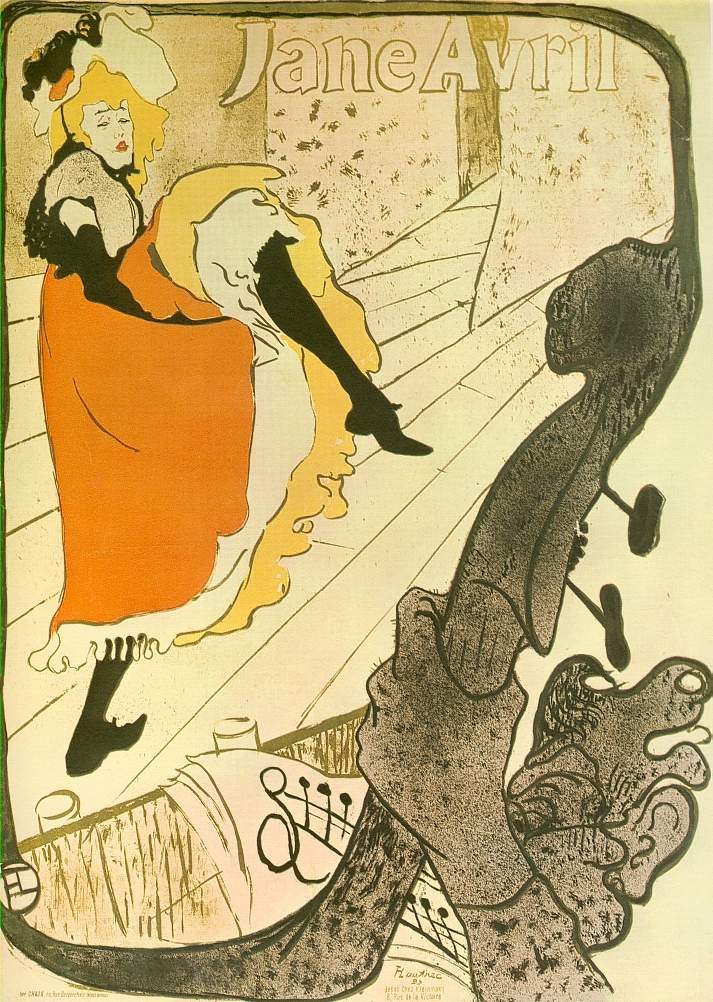
Avril (1893), lithograph printed in five colours

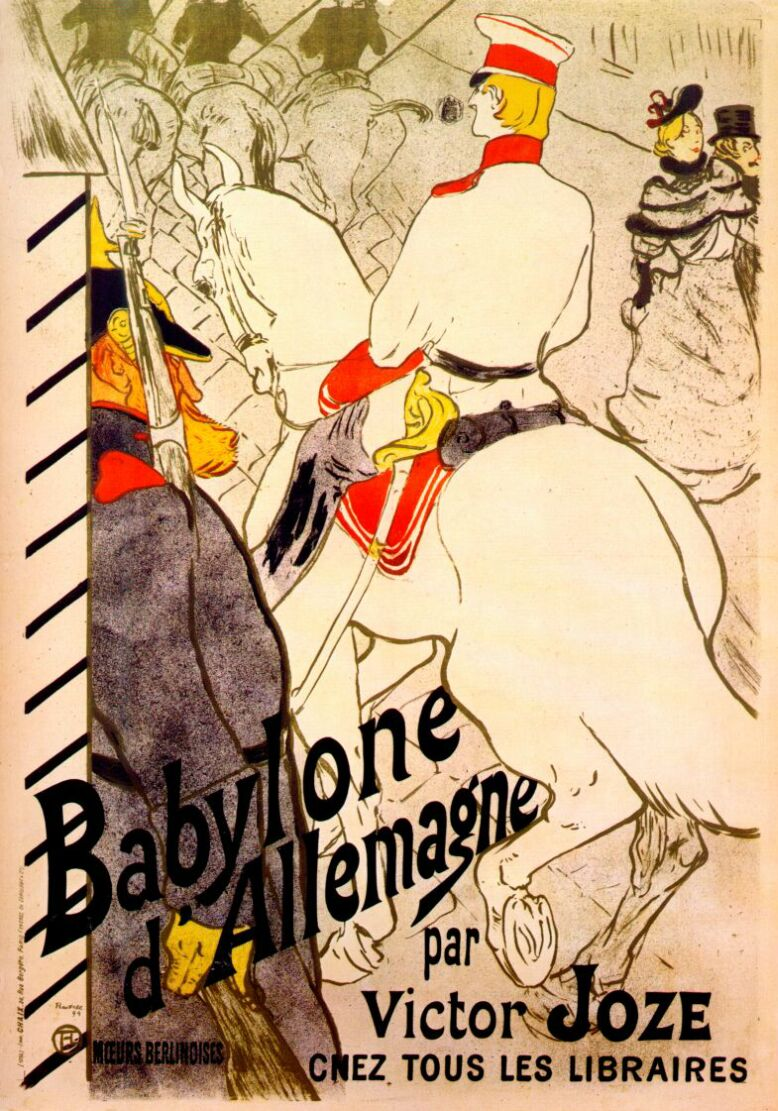
The German Babylon (1894), lithograph published by Victor Joze

==== Other ====
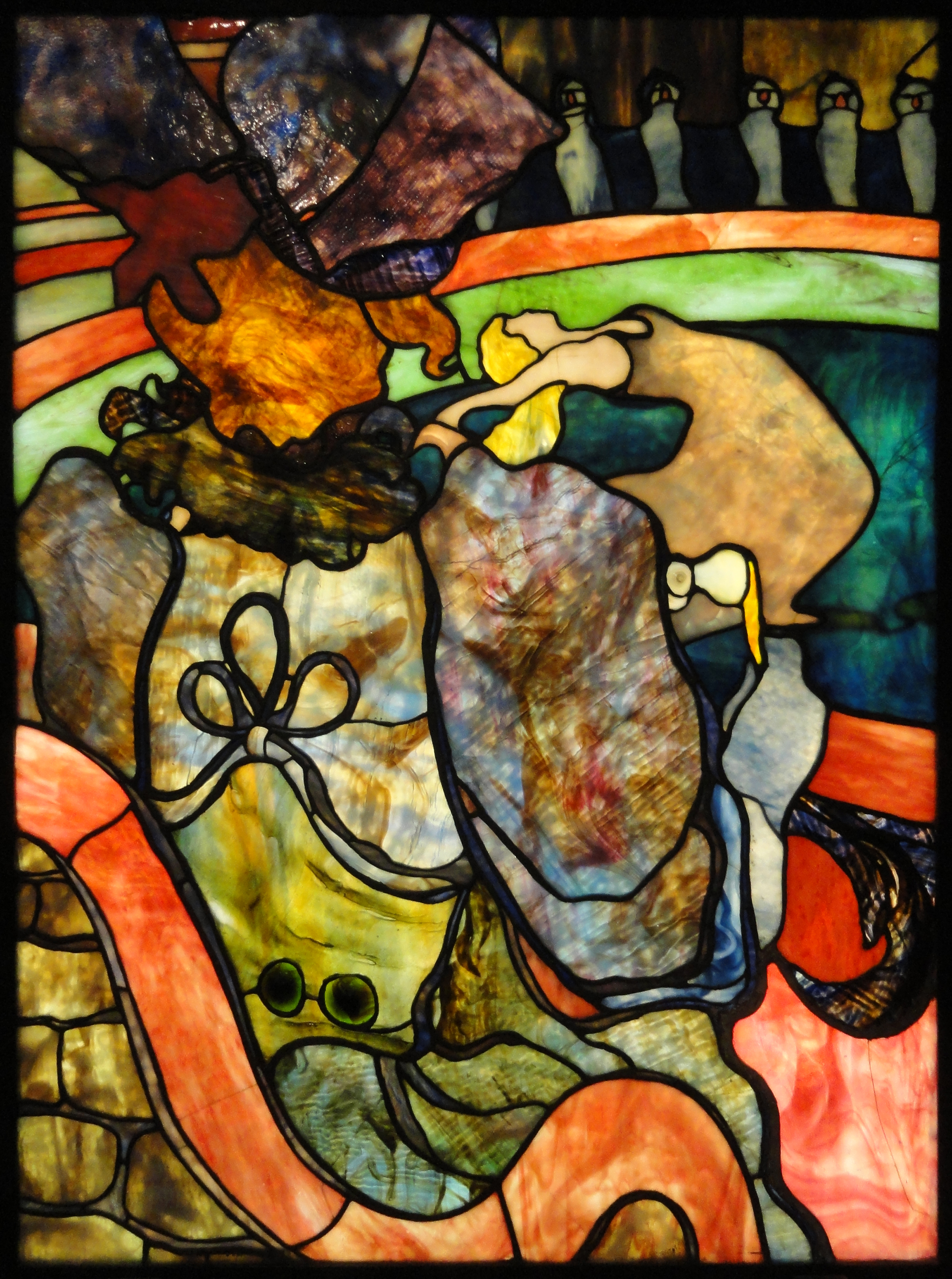
With Louis Comfort Tiffany, Au Nouveau Cirque, Papa Chrysanthème (c. 1894), stained glass, 120 × 85 cm, Musée d'Orsay

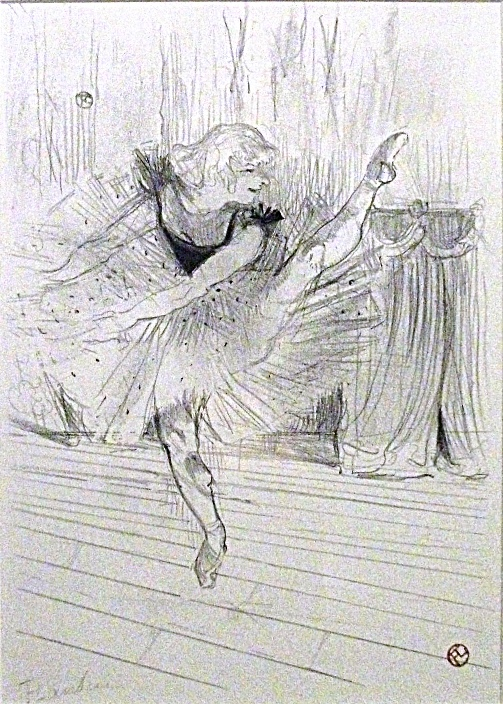
Miss Ida Heath (1894), crayon and brush lithograph with scraper

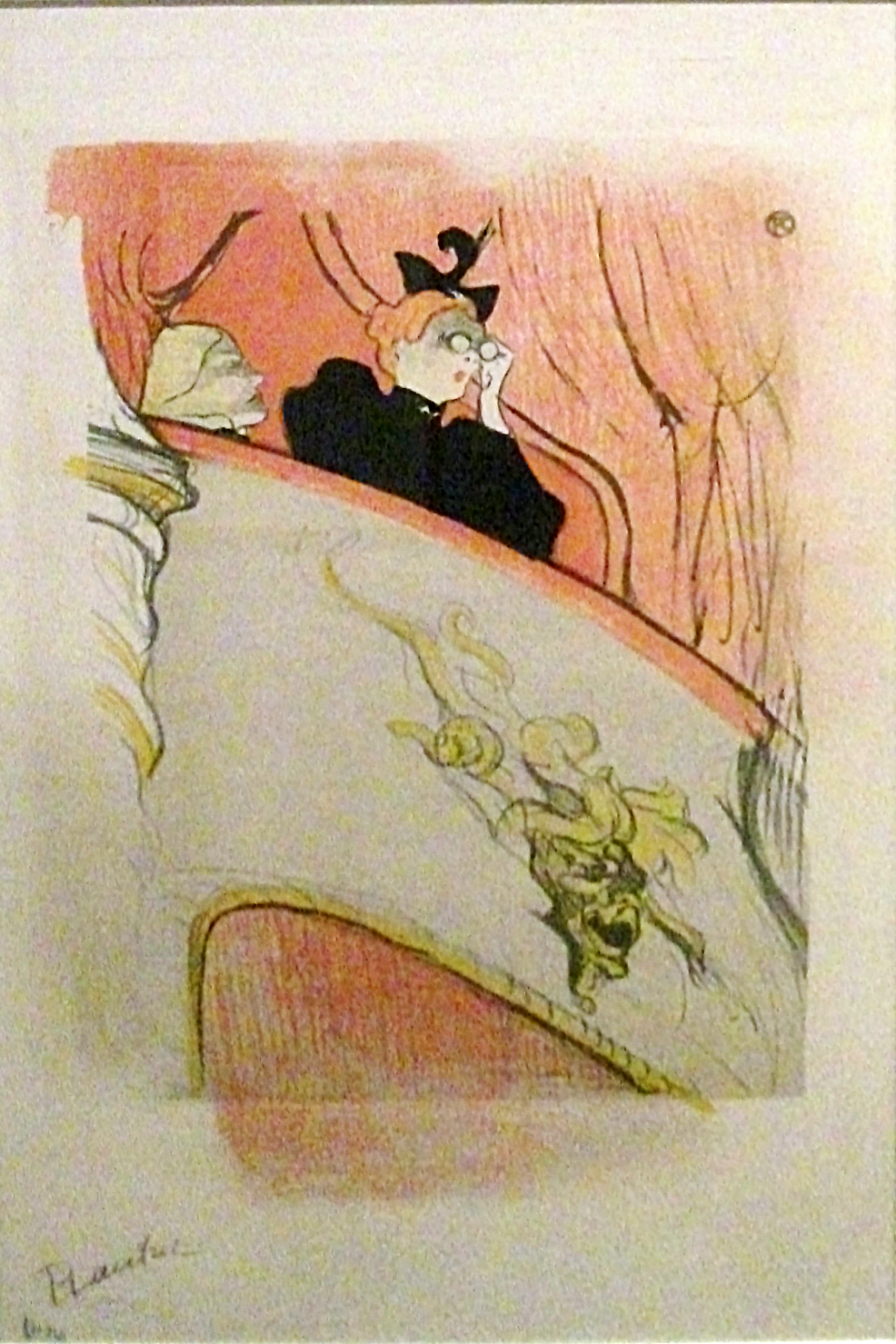
The Box with the Gilded Mask (1894), colour crayon, brush and spatter lithograph with scraper

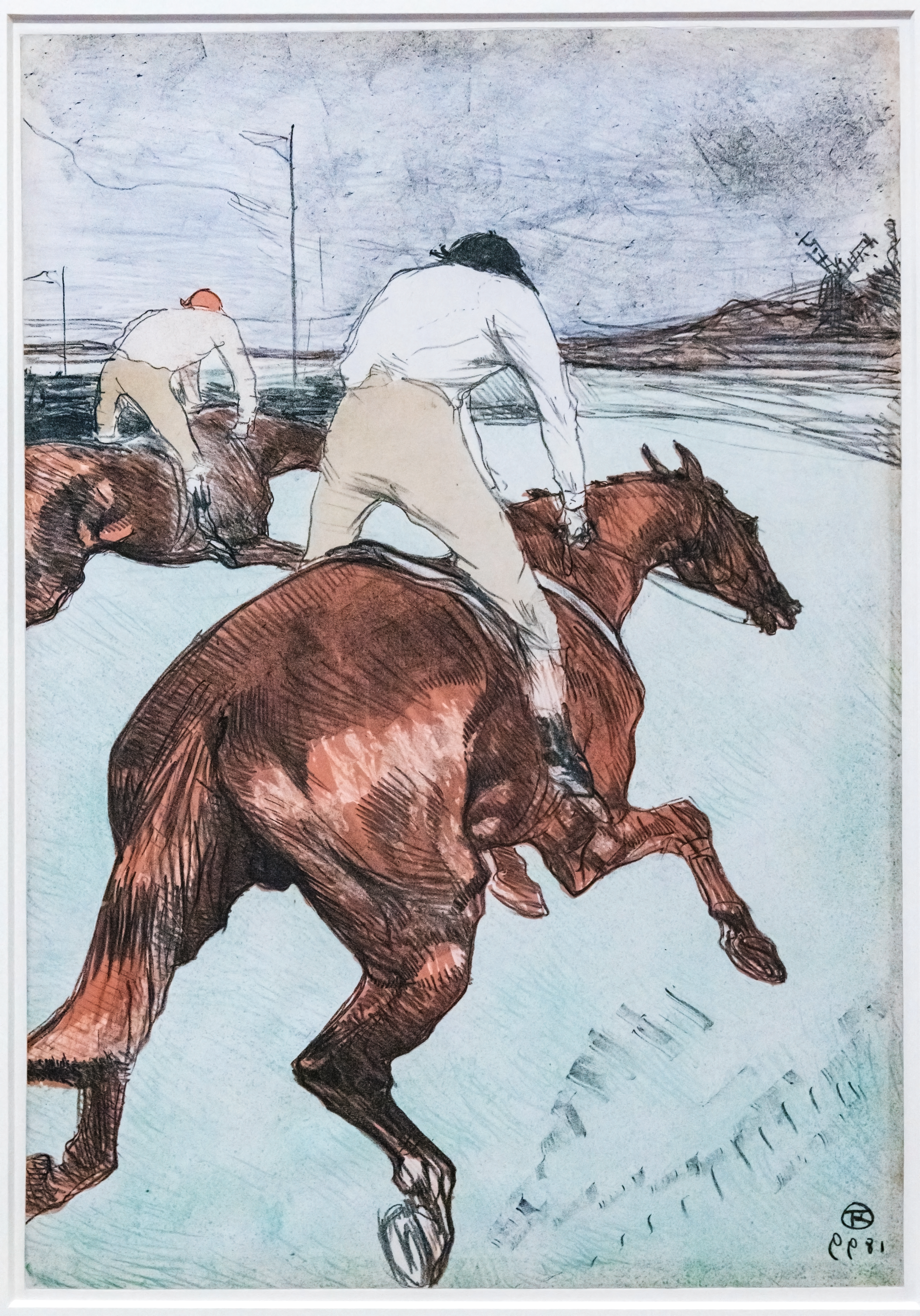
The Jockey (1899), colour lithograph, Musée Toulouse-Lautrec

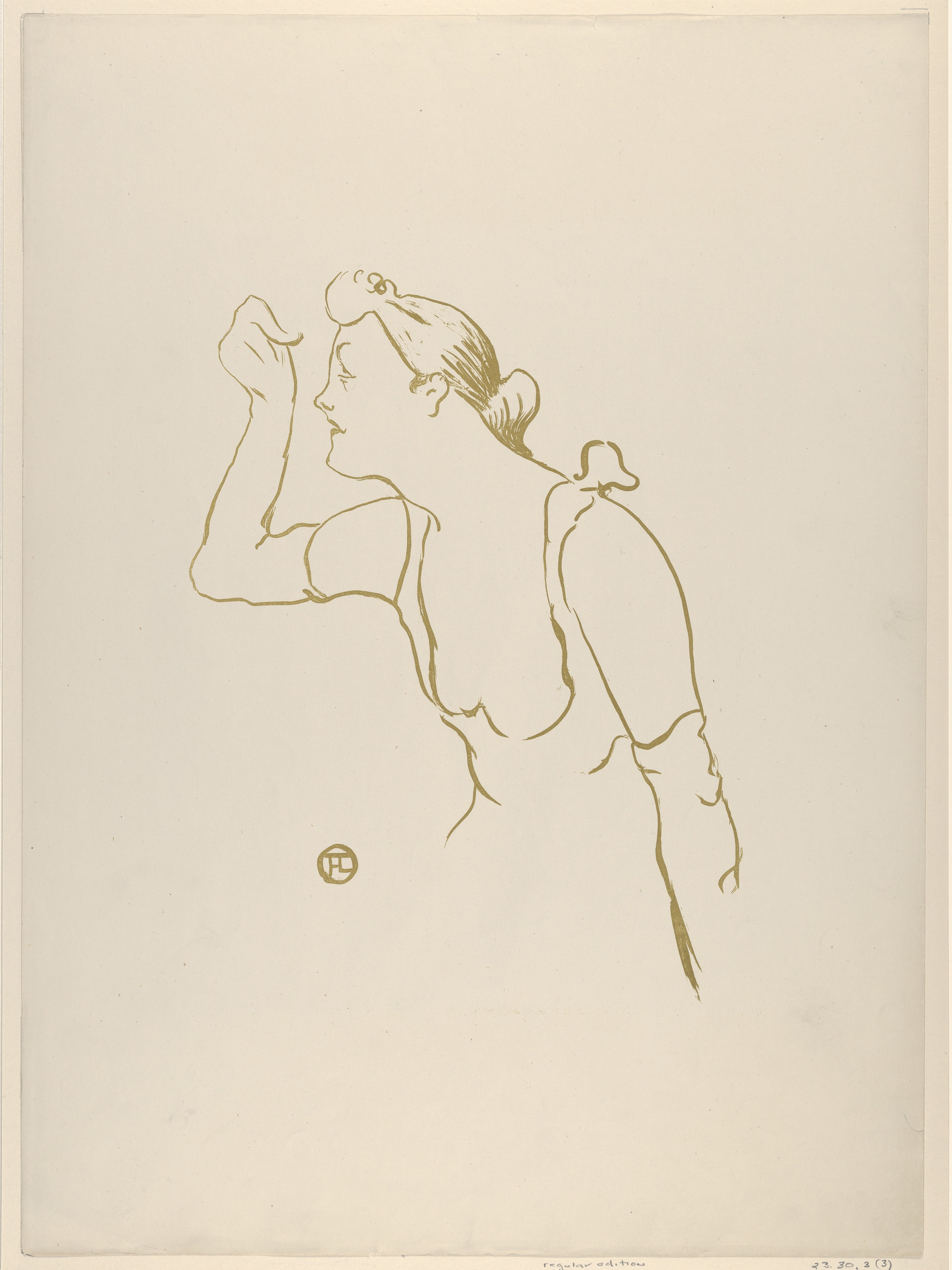
Paula Brébion – Le Café Concert series (1893), brush lithograph printed in light olive-green on wove paper, Metropolitan Museum of Art

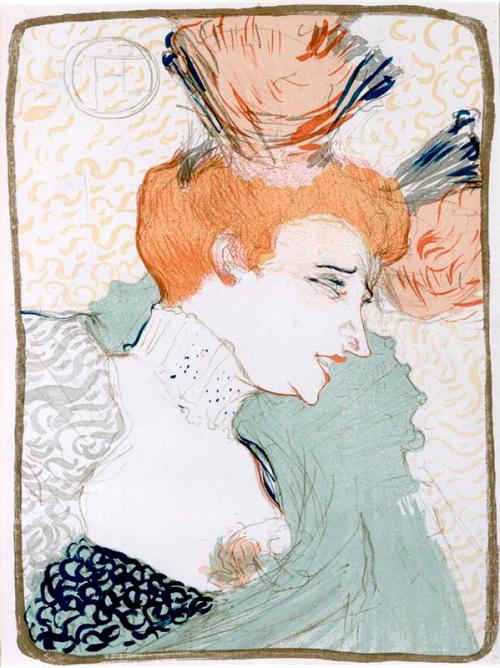
Buste de Lender-Mlle Marcelle Lender (1895), Aberdeen Archives, Gallery and Museums

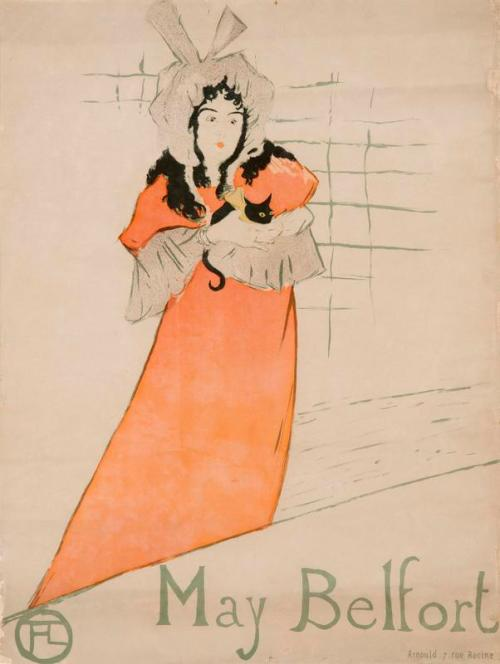
May Belfort (1895), Aberdeen Archives, Gallery and Museums

== Photos of Toulouse-Lautrec ==
Photos by Maurice Guibert

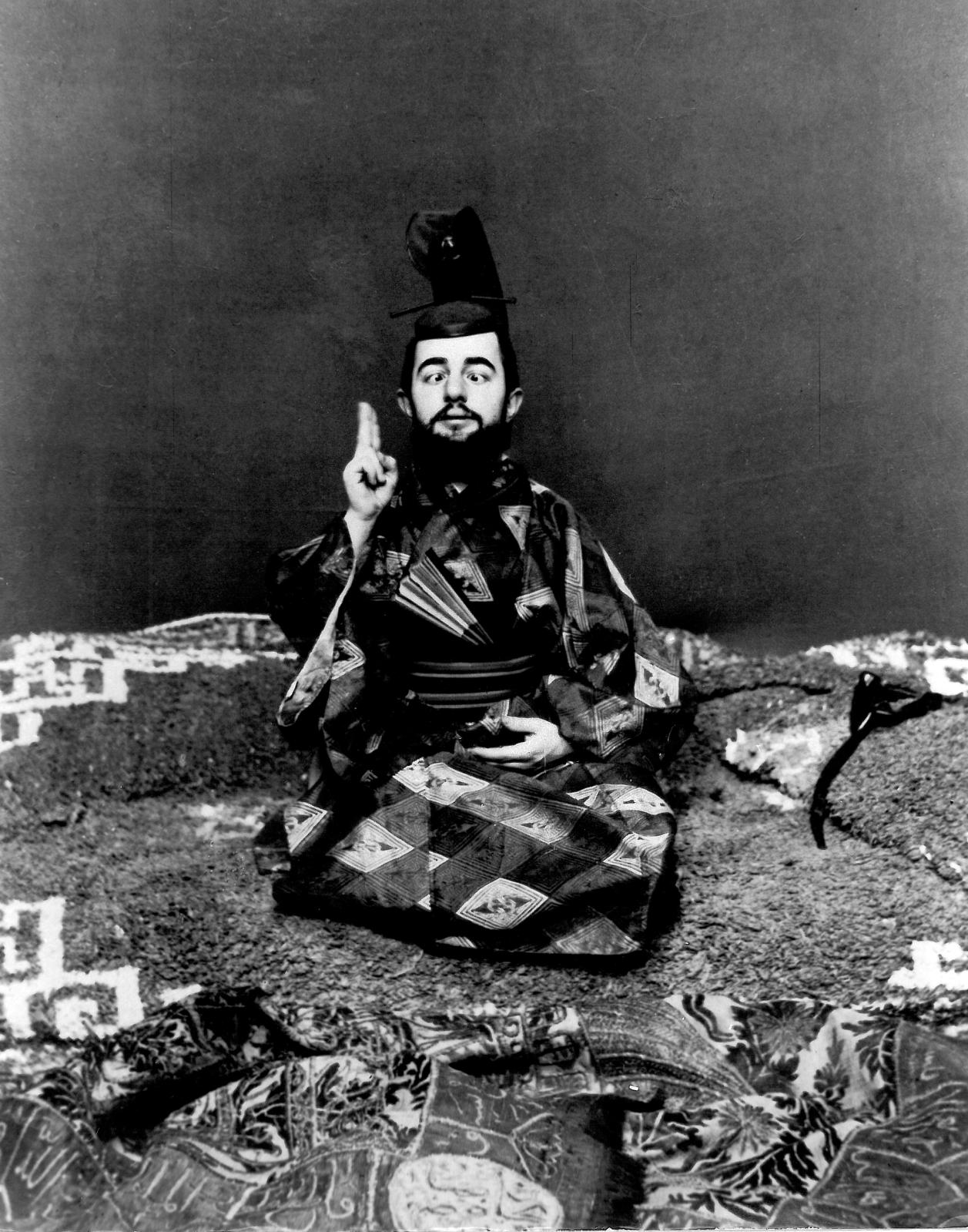
Photo (c. 1887)

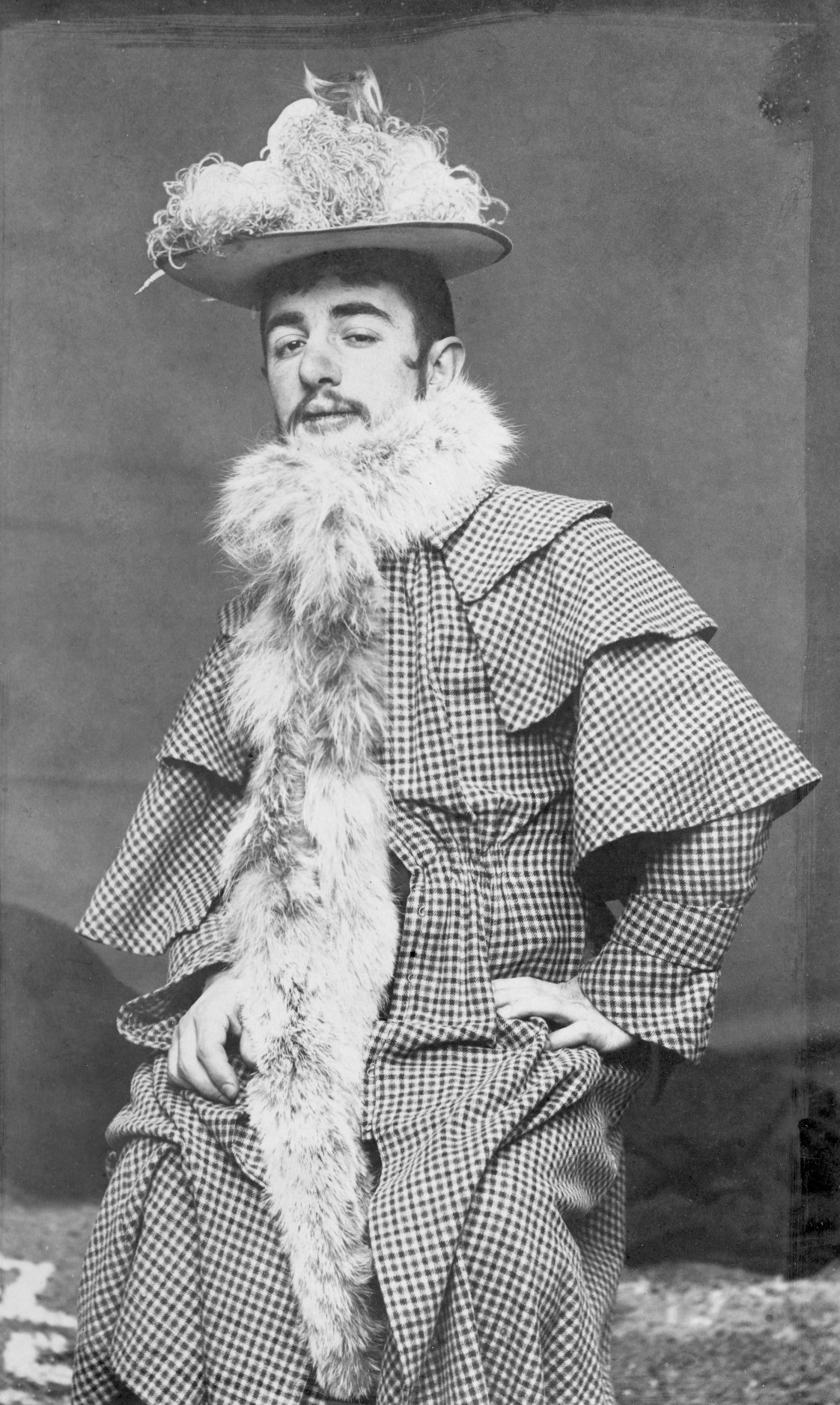
Photo (1892)

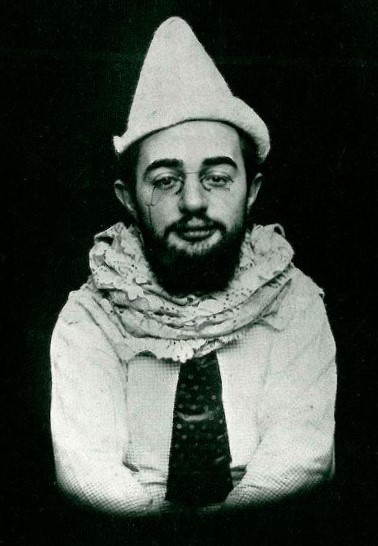
Photo

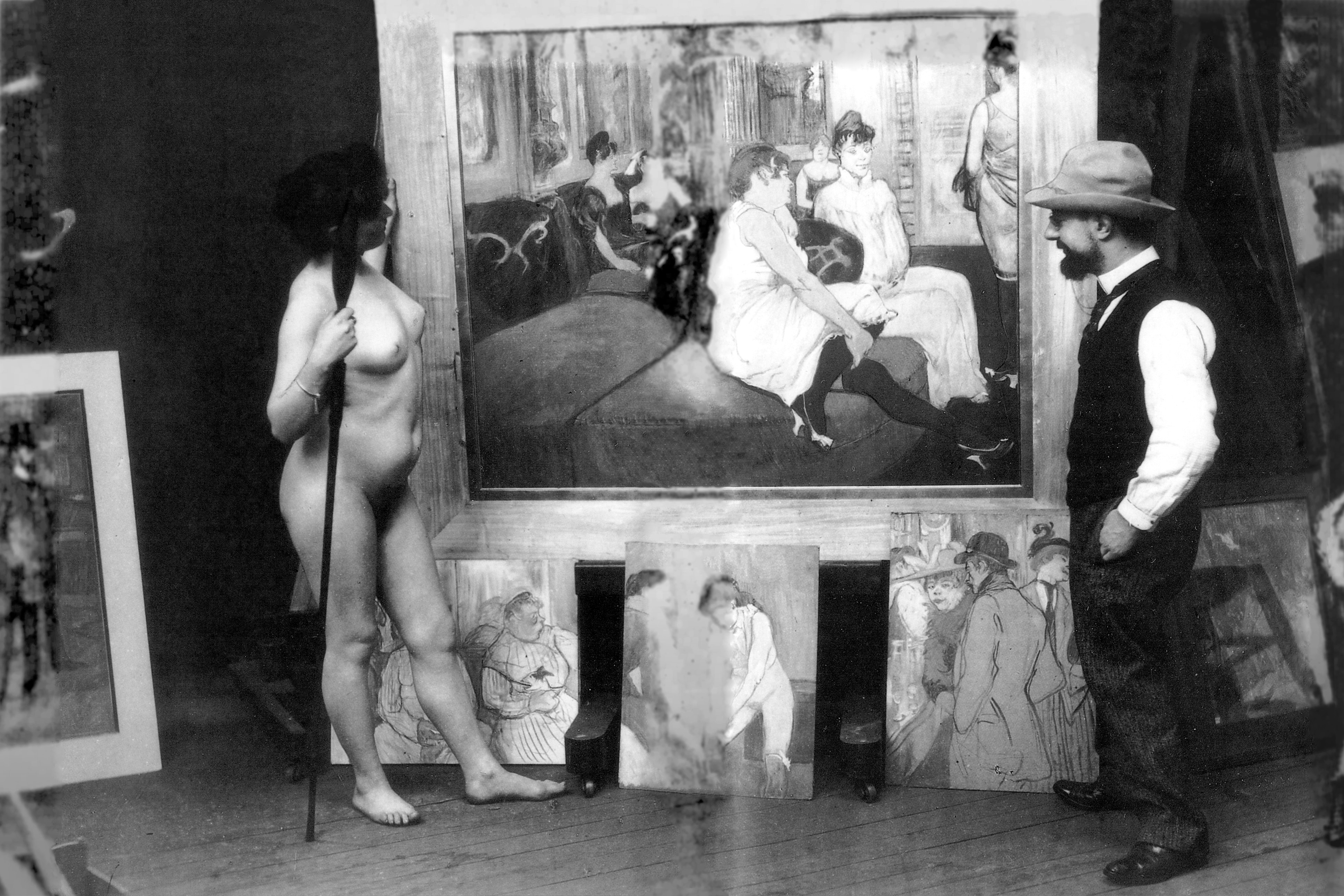
With a nude model in his studio (c. 1895)

== Auction sales ==
In a 2005 auction at Christie's auction house, La Blanchisseuse, Toulouse-Lautrec's early painting of a young laundress, sold for US$22.4 million, setting a new record for the artist for a price at auction.

== Media ==
On 20 August 2018, Toulouse-Lautrec was the featured artist on the BBC television programme Fake or Fortune?. Researchers attempted to discover whether he had created two newly discovered sketchbooks.

=== Films ===
- Moulin Rouge (1952): A film about the artist, portrayed by José Ferrer
- Moulin Rouge! (2001): A jukebox musical about artists who haunt the famous cabaret, portrayed by John Leguizamo
- Midnight in Paris (2011): A Woody Allen time travel film about Paris in the 20th century, portrayed by Vincent Menjou Cortes
- Lautrec (1998): A French biographical film directed by Roger Planchon

=== Literature ===
- Sacré Bleu: A Comedy d'Art, by Christopher Moore, in which the bon vivant artist plays the role of co-detective with the fictional lead, Lucien Lessard, in trying to unravel the death of mutual friend Vincent van Gogh.
- Moulin Rouge (novel), by Pierre La Mure (1950), historical novel based on the life of Henri de Toulouse-Lautrec.
- The historical fiction novel, The Dream Collector, "Sabrine & Vincent van Gogh" (Historium Press 2024) by R.w. Meek explores Toulouse Lautrec's relationship with Vincent van Gogh and their mutual problems with alcohol.
- Jonathan Trigell's novel Genus transposes Toulouse Lautrec and his Montmartre world into a dystopian near-future London.

== See also ==
- Art Nouveau posters and graphic arts
- Salon des Cent
- Les Maîtres de l'Affiche
