= La Toilette (Toulouse-Lautrec) =

Painting by Henri de Toulouse-Lautrec

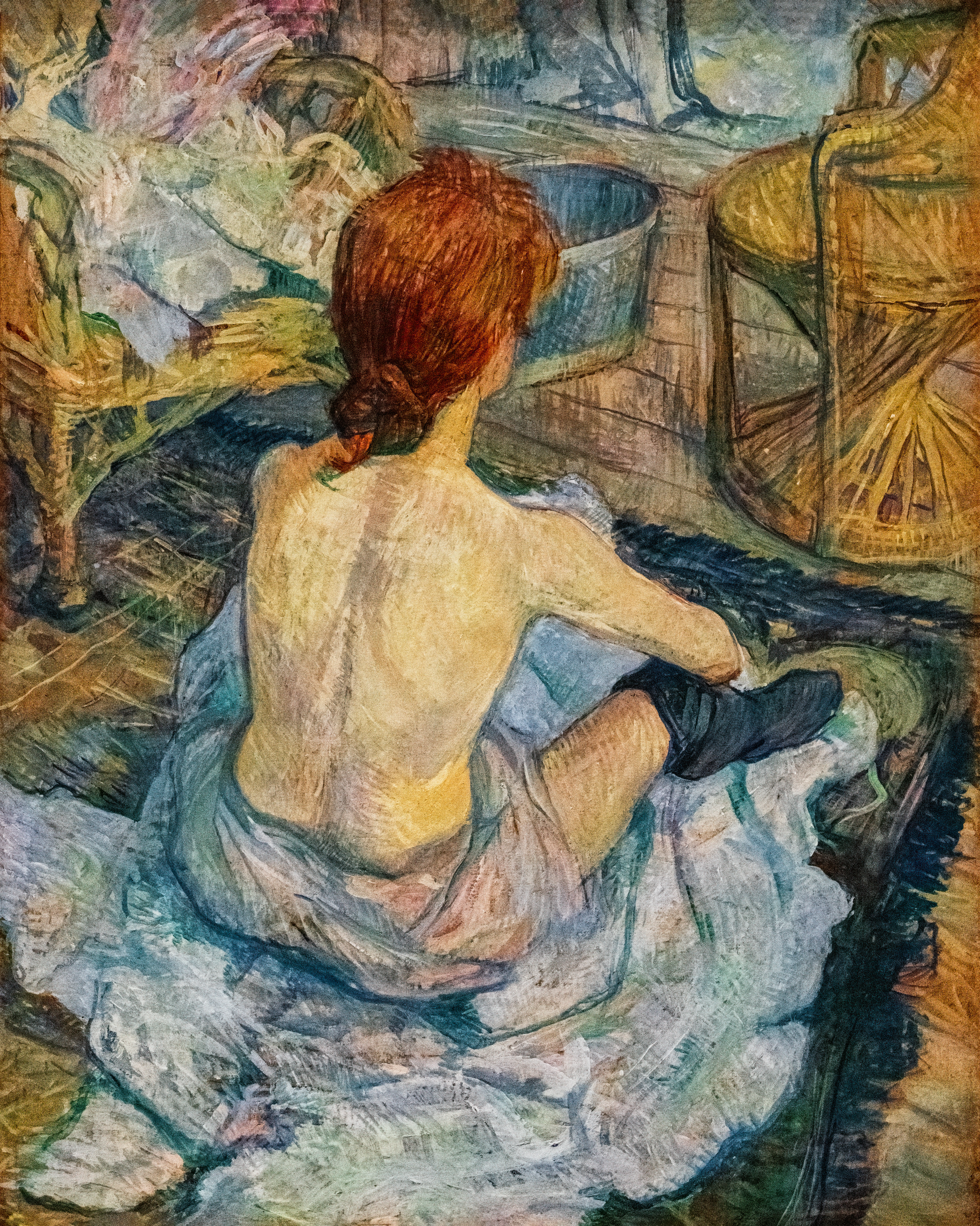
- Artist: Henri de Toulouse-Lautrec
- Year: 1889
- Medium: oil on cardboard
- Movement: Post-Impressionism
- Dimensions: 67 cm × 54 cm (26 in × 21 in)
- Location: Musée d'Orsay, Paris

La Toilette, also known as Rousse, is a painting by Henri de Toulouse-Lautrec, from 1889. The painting depicts a red-headed woman, stripped to the waist, seated on the floor, facing away from the viewer, just before or just after bathing. Held by public collections in France since 1914, it has been at the Musée d'Orsay, in Paris, since 1983.

The painting depicts a domestic scene of a woman, sitting on a plain towel or sheet over a dark rug on the bare floorboards. She is largely undressed, with bare back, arms and head, hair tied back, and bare right thigh visible. A swathe of plain fabric is wrapped around her waist, with a black boot or stocking on her right lower leg. Other clothing is draped over a chair to the left.

The work was painted in oils on cardboard, and measures 67 cm × 54 cm (26 in × 21 in). It employs a light colour palette, predominantly blues with yellowish greens and red for the woman's hair, thinned with turpentine to create a loose effect. The Impressionist image, similar to a work in pastels or a sketch, with an elevated viewpoint, shows some influence from similar works by Edgar Degas, including those exhibited at the 8th (and last) Impressionist exhibition in Paris in 1886.

In the background are two wickerwork chairs and a bathtub, suggesting the woman is undressing to bathe, or getting dressed after washing. The furniture, recognisable from contemporaneous photographs, suggests the work was painted at Toulouse-Lautrec's studio on the rue Caulaincourt in Paris. It may have been made in one session, directly from life, with no studies. The model may be one of Toulouse-Lautrec's favourites, Carmen Gaudin (1866?–1920).

It was catalogued as La toilette and dated 1896 for some time, but recent research suggests it was painted several years earlier, in 1889. It was one of two works that Toulouse-Lautrec exhibited with Les XX ("The twenty", an avant-garde art group) in Brussels in 1890 under the title Rousse (red-head). In the catalogue, it was described as "a red-haired woman seated on the floor, seen from the back, nude".

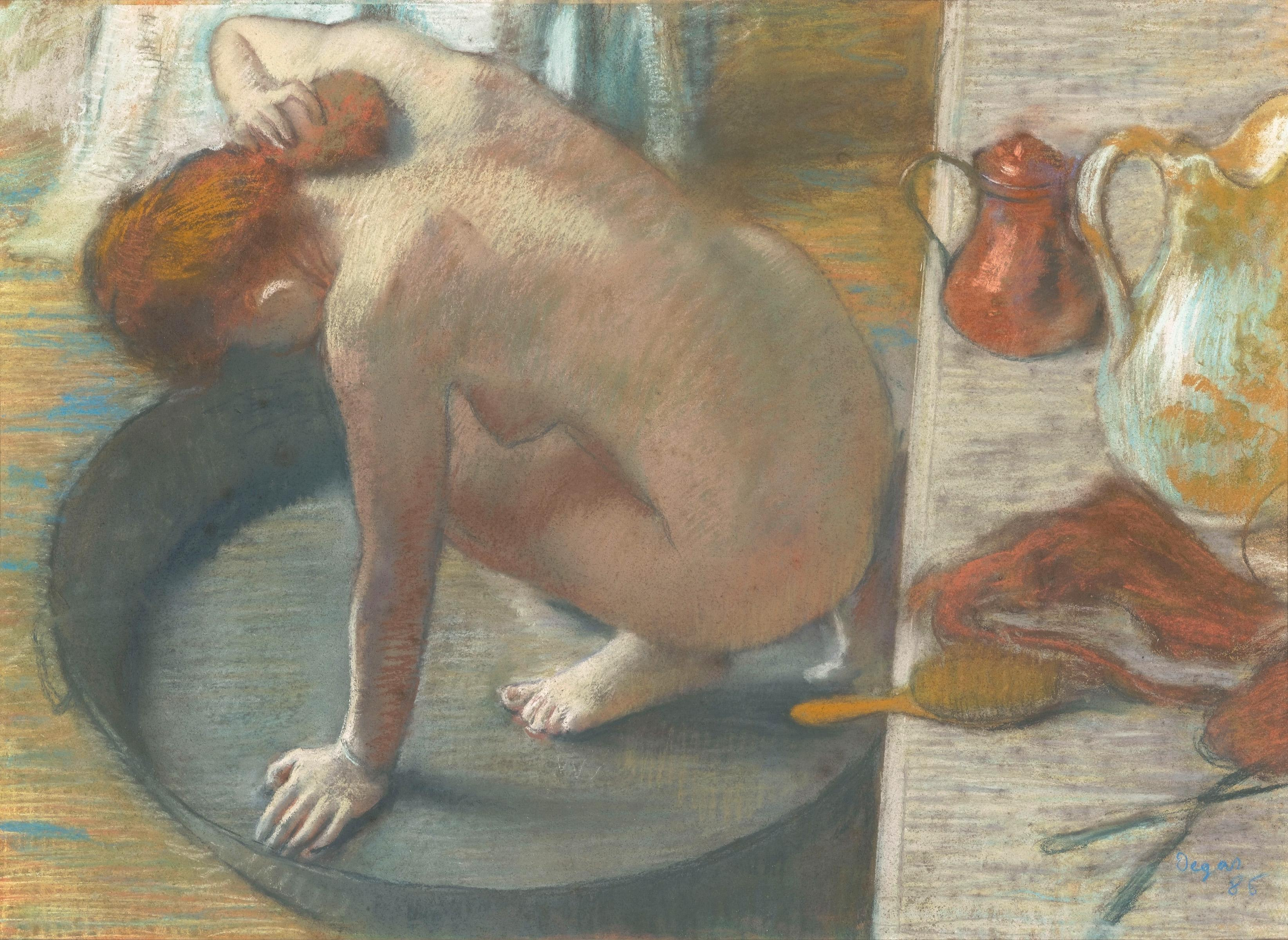
Edgar Degas, The Tub, 1886, from a series of seven paintings of women washing, which inspired Toulouse-Lautrec

The painting was donated to France by Pierre Goujon on his death in 1914. It was first displayed in the Musée du Luxembourg, then at the Musée National d'Art Moderne, and later at the Musée du Louvre. It was transferred to the Musée d'Orsay in 1983.
