= Elles (series) =

1896 series by Henri de Toulouse-Lautrec

Elles (Them) is an 1896 series of color lithographs created by French artist Henri de Toulouse-Lautrec. They are part of his series of works based on scenes from French brothels he was known to visit from 1892 to 1895. Elles was first published by Gustave Pellet and exhibited in Paris at the 20th Salon des Cent on April 22, 1896. The show attracted little initial attention and sold poorly, as it portrayed a sympathetic depiction of prostitutes undergoing their everyday routine devoid of eroticism. Artist Edvard Munch was known to have bought an entire set of lithographs.

== Background ==
In the mid-1890s, French artist Henri de Toulouse-Lautrec (1864–1901) frequented brothels on the rue d'Amboise and the rue des Moulins. He often took friends or relatives along with him to socialize in the brothels. He was open about his predilection for prostitutes, feeling more at home among them than in aristocratic society where he was treated as an outcast due to his disability of being short-statured. Lautrec had the outward appearance of dwarfism, attributed to a genetic condition. At home in the brothels, he was known as "Monsieur Henri" where he would draw the women during their downtime. Biographer Julia Frey writes that Lautrec, "became, in a sense, one of the family to the women in the brothels, a friend and confidant, eating meals with them, getting to know their problems, participating in their gossip, observing them in their various occupations and pleasures." He even helped decorate the brothels. Along the way, he created hundreds of paintings and drawings of prostitutes going about their everyday life. When his mother eventually found out, she asked a priest to take him to task. In response, Lautrec told the priest, "I'm digging my grave with my cock". Lautrec died in 1901 due to complications from syphilis and alcoholism.

== Series ==
The series contains an album of 12 lithographic prints, two of which are the same image used separately for a cover and frontispiece. A 13th print, also of the same image, was used as a poster advertising the series, leaving only 11 original artworks in the series. The Cleveland Museum of Art holds a set of 11 lithographs. None of the works in the series are considered erotic, which perhaps contributed to their lack of commercial success. Lautrec was said to have sympathized with the women in the brothels and humanized their depiction as prostitutes, showing them undergoing their everyday routines.

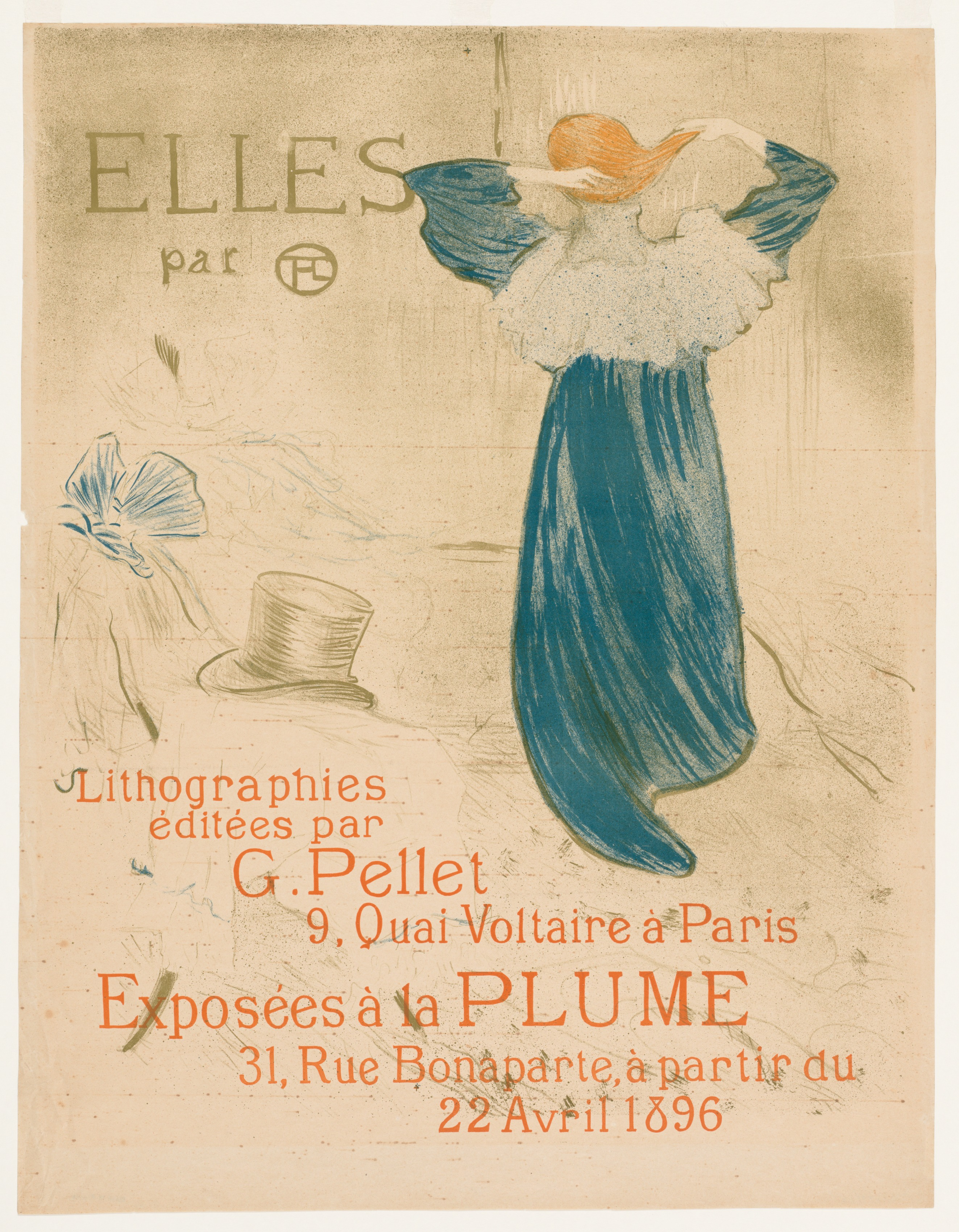
Poster for the exhibition

Cover

Frontispiece

The Seated Clown, Mlle Cha-u-Ka-o

Woman Carrying a Tray, Mme. Baron and Mlle. Popo

Woman Sleeping

Woman at the Tub

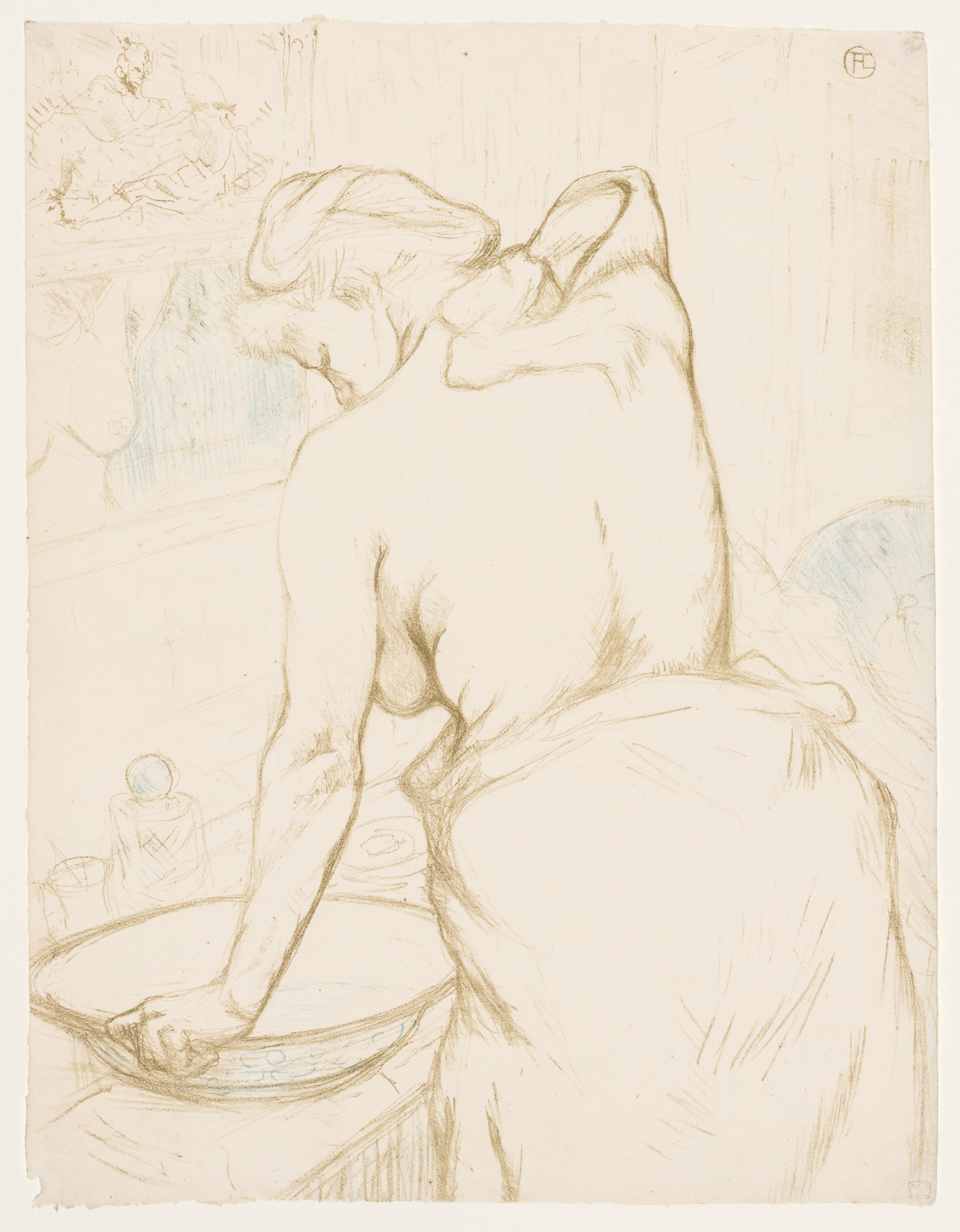
The Toilet

Woman Combing Her Hair

Woman in a Corset

Woman Lying on Her Back

Woman with a Hand Mirror

Woman in Bed

== Exhibition ==
The Cleveland Museum of Art exhibited selections from the series in 1986 (Mary Cassatt and the Feminine Ideal in 19th-Century Paris) and in 2013 (Prints by Toulouse-Lautrec and Bonnard).

== See also ==
- Prostitution in Impressionist painting
- Seirō Jūnitoki (1794)
