= Prostitution in Impressionist painting =

Prostitution in Impressionist painting was a common subject in the art of the period. Prostitution was a very widespread phenomenon in nineteenth-century Paris and although an accepted practice among the nineteenth century bourgeoisie, it was nevertheless a topic that remained largely taboo in polite society. As a result, Impressionist works depicting the prostitute often became the subject of scandal, and particularly venomous criticism. Some works showed her with considerable sympathy, while others attempted to impart an agency to her; likewise some work showed high-class courtesans, and others prostitutes awaiting clients on the streets. In addition to the sexual revulsion/attraction the figure of the prostitute stirred, she functioned as a sign of modernity, a clear sign of the entanglement of sex, class, power and money.

"Prostitution, now hidden in the shadows, was for these painters a fact of modernity, and while they drew inspiration from women of the night, they also at times imagined the distance between the studio and the brothel was not so great. Charles Baudelaire, in his early intimate journals, made the equation explicit: 'What is art? Prostitution.'"

== Nineteenth-century France ==
Prostitution was a part of society and integrated into life in France. The brothels and street walkers were regulated by the state; it was legal in Paris in the nineteenth century and government regulation were placed on brothels. By 1810 Paris alone had 180 government approved brothels. There were bi-weekly inspections of all brothels, which by law were controlled by women. Registering as a prostitute in Paris involved having the woman's real name on a national registry and agreeing to the terms of the bi-weekly medical exams to make sure the prostitutes were not carrying venereal diseases. The bi weekly medical examinations set a standard that was used and spread quickly throughout Europe.

Prostitutes in nineteenth-century Paris were arrested for contravention and malady. Contravention, or breaking the rules, was used as a reason for the arrest of a prostitute when they engaged in anything that went against a government law. Prostitutes could also be arrested if they had a venereal disease. According to scholar Alain Corbin, arresting a prostitute for having a venereal disease served as a way of keeping Paris "clean", both morally and physically. Although the existence of prostitution posed a threat to nineteenth-century Parisian society, it was viewed as a "necessary evil. The view that prostitution was to be tolerated in Paris comes from the belief that it was needed for survival. As a requirement for survival, prostitution helped to "satisfy the needs of men" and prevented infection through the excretion of bodily fluids.

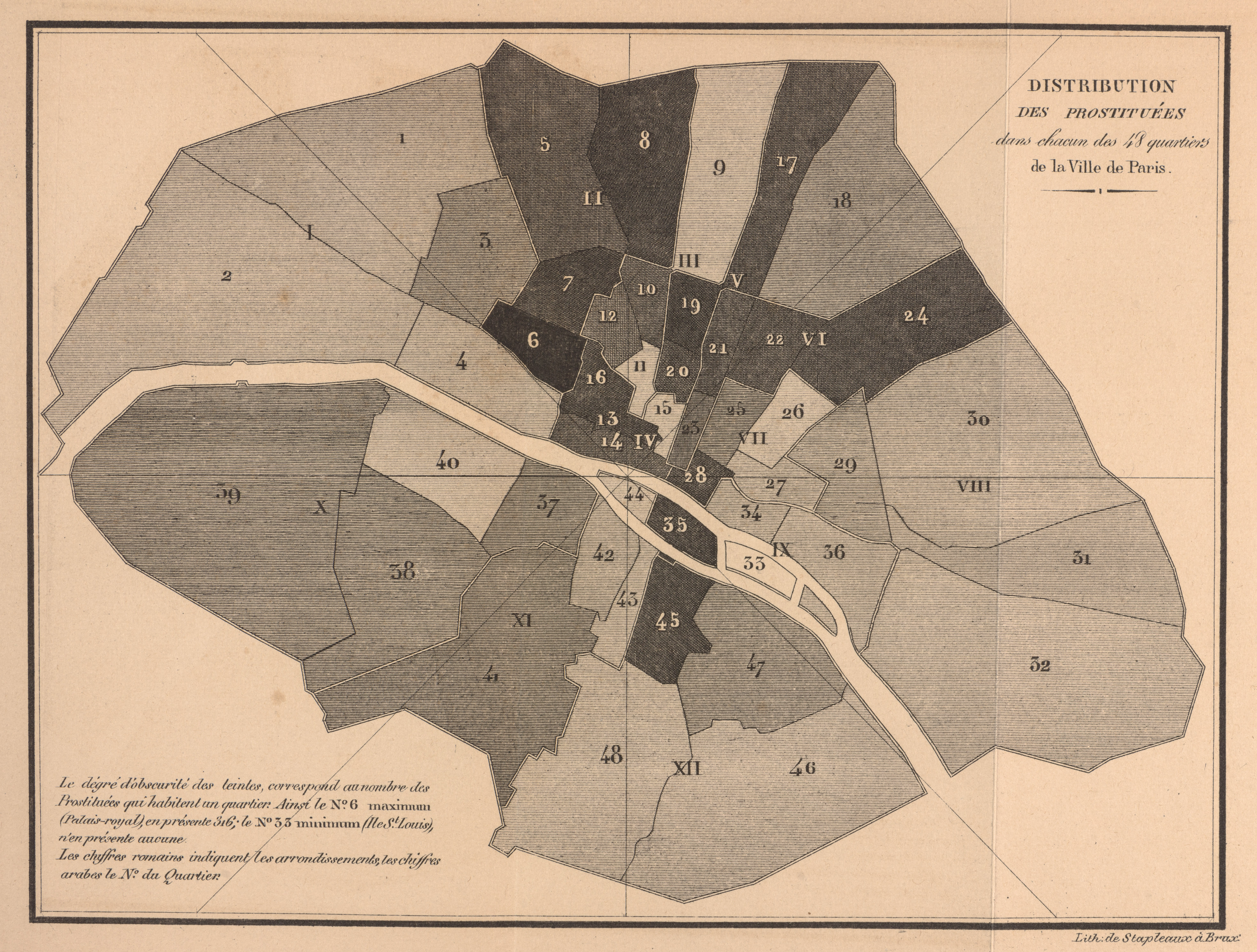
Alexandre Jean-Baptiste, Distribution of Prostitutes in Paris, 1836 - Cornell University Library

During the nineteenth century, many women were forced into prostitution. Most scholars have noted that women who were alone in life or abandoned did not have another choice. On the spectrum of prostitution, there were illegal prostitutes, street walkers, legal workers in brothels and courtesans of the bourgeoisie class. The women who were involved in brothels, or walked the street legally or illegally were regulated by the government and subjected to their rules, whereas the courtesans of the upper class were basically ignored by the government. Street walkers (for example those depicted in the film Les Miserables, (Directed by Tom Hopper in 2012), worked impoverished areas to support their family or themselves. According to Robert Schwartz and his students at Mount Holyoke College, these women lead miserable lives and might service hundreds of men for sexual pleasure. Men often attacked brothels, and the majority of these assaults would go undocumented. On the opposite end of the spectrum, courtesans would often be able to choose which men they served and possibly worked as a courtesan as a second job. These women lived pampered lives, and would be able to make choices for themselves. Above all, courtesans were not forced to abide by the laws that street walkers did. A section of brothels that were most well known and considered to be the most expensive were called Maisons de Tolérance. The appearance of these brothels looked like regular living apartments on the outside.

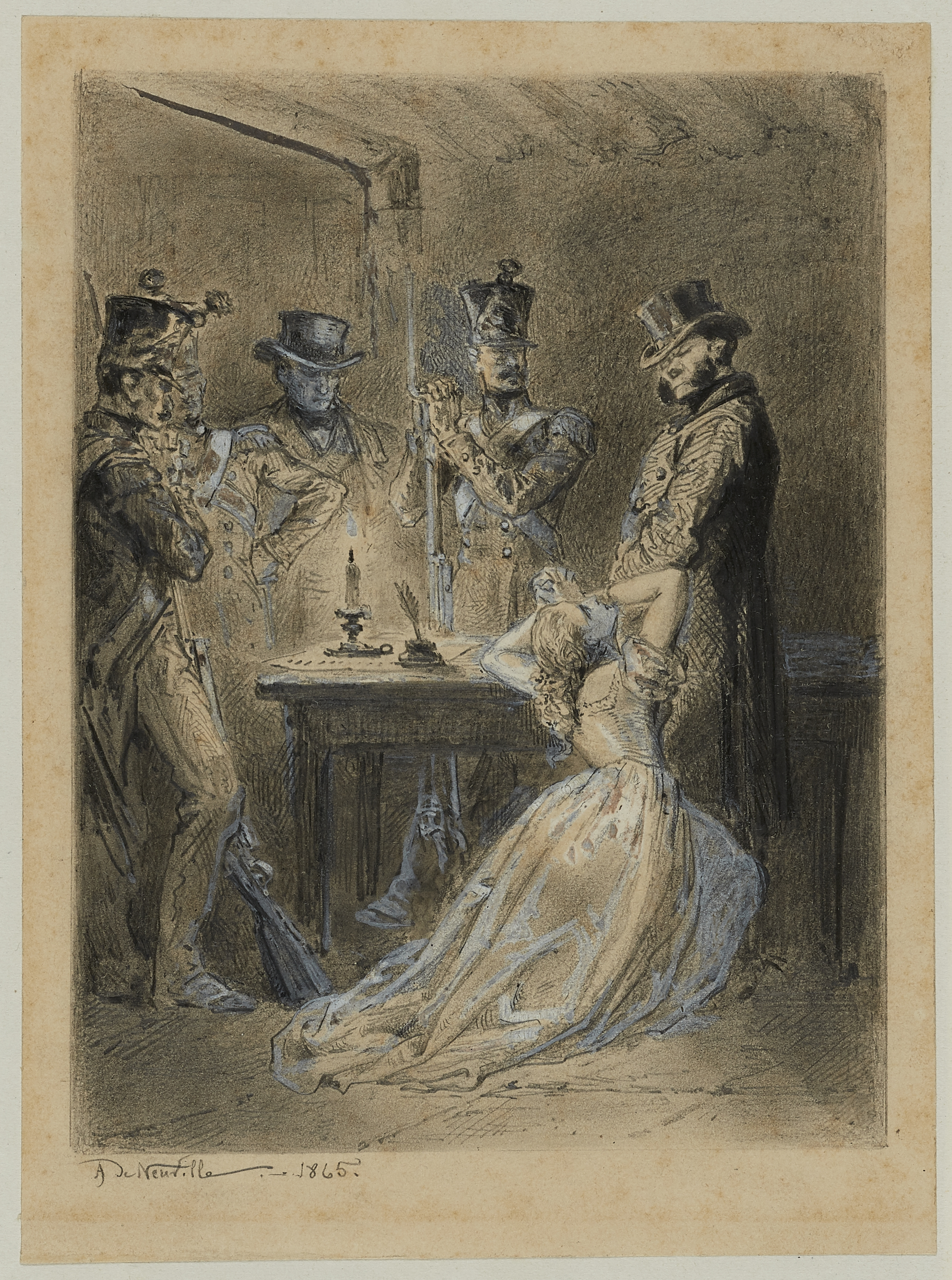
Alphonse de Neuville's drawing of Fantine at Javert's feet in Les Misérables

The interest in prostitution became prevalent in French art and culture during this time, with paintings such as Édouard Manet's Olympia (1863) and novels such as Émile Zola's Nana,( 1880) or Alfred de Musset, Rolla (1833). Victor Hugo (1802-1885) portrayed 'streetwalkers' in Les Misérables (1862) as desperate women forced to sell themselves, women with no options, such as his character Fantine. In Fantine's case, she was forced to turn to prostitution to support herself and her daughter, Cosette, after losing her factory job.

Alexandre Dumas (1824-1895), like many men, was familiar with the world of prostitution. He was in love with a courtesan, a woman named Marie Duplessis, about whom he would go to write a very popular novel, and then a play based on his experience with her called La Dame aux Camélias, (1848). Men of this time, as stated by Dumas, were born with the need for sexual promiscuity; women were not. He made many claims scorning women of the night.

Charles Baudelaire believed that in many ways the poet resembled a prostitute because they sold their poetry, a part of themselves; to sell their works they were selling themselves. Essentially, the city of Paris revolved around a form of prostitution, consumerism. He believed that no one understood this more than the flâneur (an idler or lounger). Baudelaire claimed that prostitution was embedded in Paris and everything involved with it.

=== Édouard Manet: Olympia (1863) ===
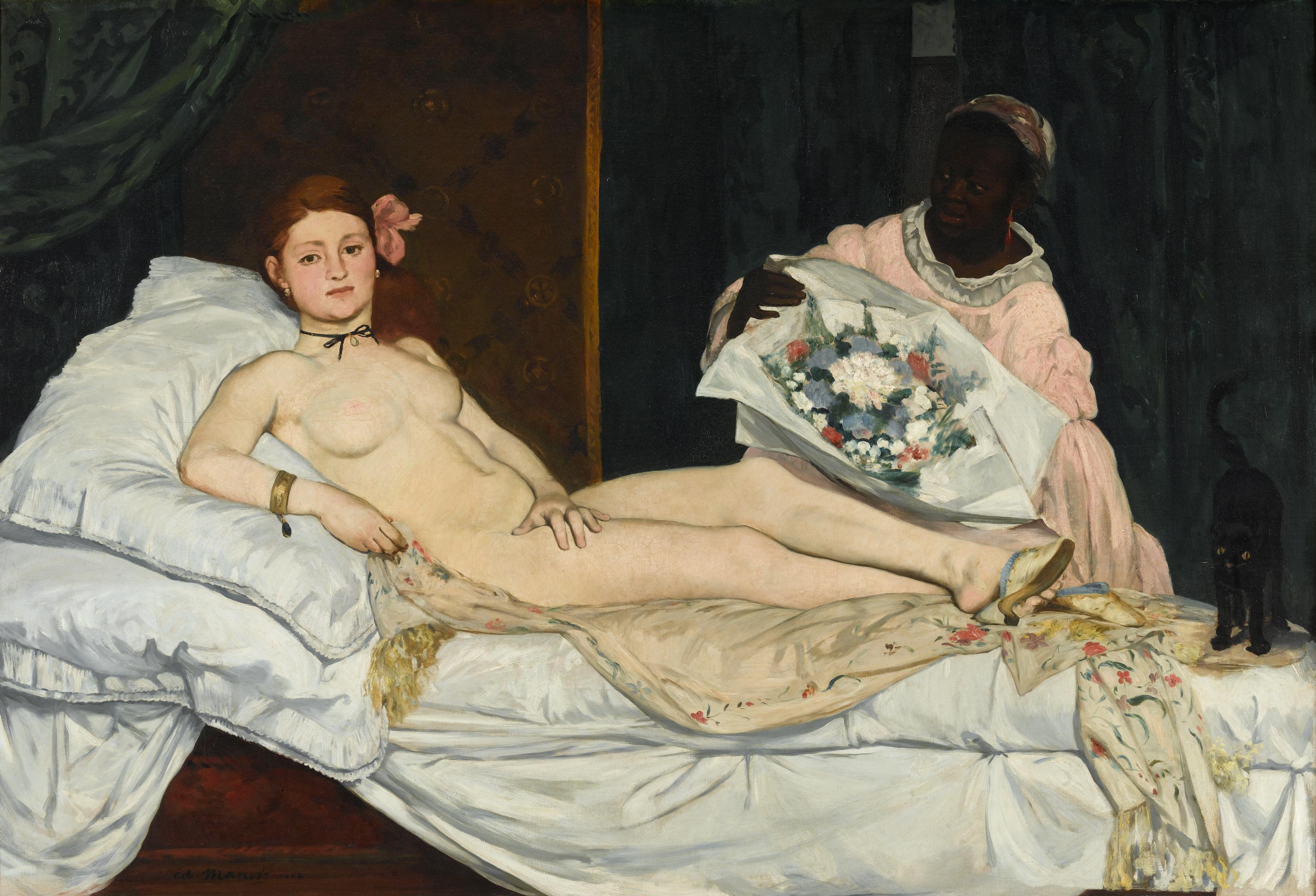
Edouard Manet - Olympia

On two occasions, Manet painted works which focused on prostitutes and caused great scandal when exhibited.

According to T.J. Clark, during this time period, the issue of prostitution was brought into the center of society whereas in the past, it had been pushed to the outskirts. The divisions between the outskirts of society and what was acknowledged and accepted were not as clear as they had been. Édouard Manet's (1832-1883) Olympia (1863) attracted negative criticism unlike any other painting had before.

Jean Ravenel's described the work as a

Painting of the school of Baudelaire, freely executed by a pupil of Goya; the vicious strangeness of the little faubouricienne, woman of the night from Paul Niquer's, from the mysteries of Paris and the nightmares of Edgar Poe. Her look has the sourness of someone prematurely aged, her face the disturbing perfume of a fleur du mal; her body fatigued, corrupted, but painted under a single trans- parent light...

The journalist Bonnin wrote the following in La France :"We prefer to think he [Manet] has made a mistake. And what is his aim? His canvases are too unfinished for us possibly to tell".

The work was considered unfinished, like a sketch rather than a real painting.“Olympia” was the name preferred by prostitutes because it referred to La Dona Olympia, the main character of a book by Etienne Delécluze. As Clark notes, the work was found offensive because some people thought she was not a courtesan but a working class prostitute, making her class and place in society definitive and less of an abstract, floating idea. People also did not like this painting because of the lack of skill it seemingly portrayed on Manet's part. They objected particularly to the black outlines and yellowish skin tone present in the painting. Most art historians agree that Manet was challenging the romantic ideals of female nudity and prostitution that were previously held in society. By giving Olympia a completely disinterested expression on her face, the fact that prostitution is a job, unromantic and unenjoyable, for her, is emphasized.

The painting itself was inspired by Titian's (1488-1576) Venus of Urbino (1534), but was seen as a crude, badly painted version of its highly esteemed academic predecessor. Many critics chose to ignore the similarities between the two works and viewed them as two totally separate and unrelated paintings.

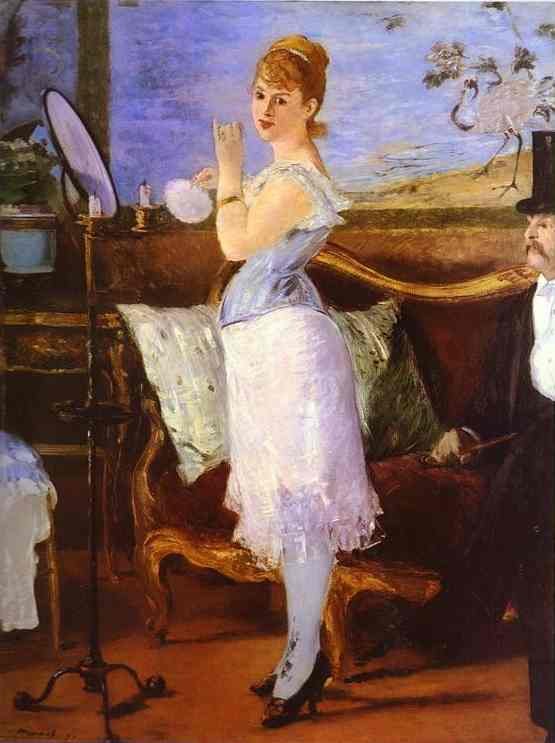
Edouard Manet Nana

=== Edouard Manet: Nana (1877) ===
In 1877, Edouard Manet created the painting Nana (1877). Due to its scandalous nature, Manet's painting was not included in the yearly Salon. The inspiration for this painting was the novel L'Assommoir (1876) by Émile Zola. The model for Nana was a Parisian, fr:Henriette Hauser. The painting shows a young, beautiful woman standing in front of a mirror. She is not completely dressed: She is wearing only a short, sleeveless bodice, a slip, silk stockings, and high – heeled shoes. Henriette is in a dressing room called a boudoir and behind her is a settee. A gentlemen caller is seated behind her in a top hat, staring at her as she is turned to face the audience.

Manet's painting of the courtesan created much controversy at the time. Society believed prostitutes to be submissive and weak. Nana's gaze challenged this notion. Just like in Manet's Olympia, she is staring back at the audience, challenging them. According to Billie Wei, the reversal of gender roles helped to make the painting so controversial. Wei also notes that Manet gives Nana power by painting her surroundings as an "extensions of her corporal being". Wei mentions how "the mirror faces her, the sofa's golden frame curves in parallel with the gentle roundness of her belly, and the blue of the painting behind her echoes the blue of her bodice." The fact that she is at the center of the painting gives her more authority as she is the main character, the protagonist. This feature was scandalous. The fact that the prostitute has more power is made evident in the way the male figure is turned sideways, with only half of his body visible, giving him less significance in the piece.

=== Edgar Degas: Brothel Monotypes and other works ===
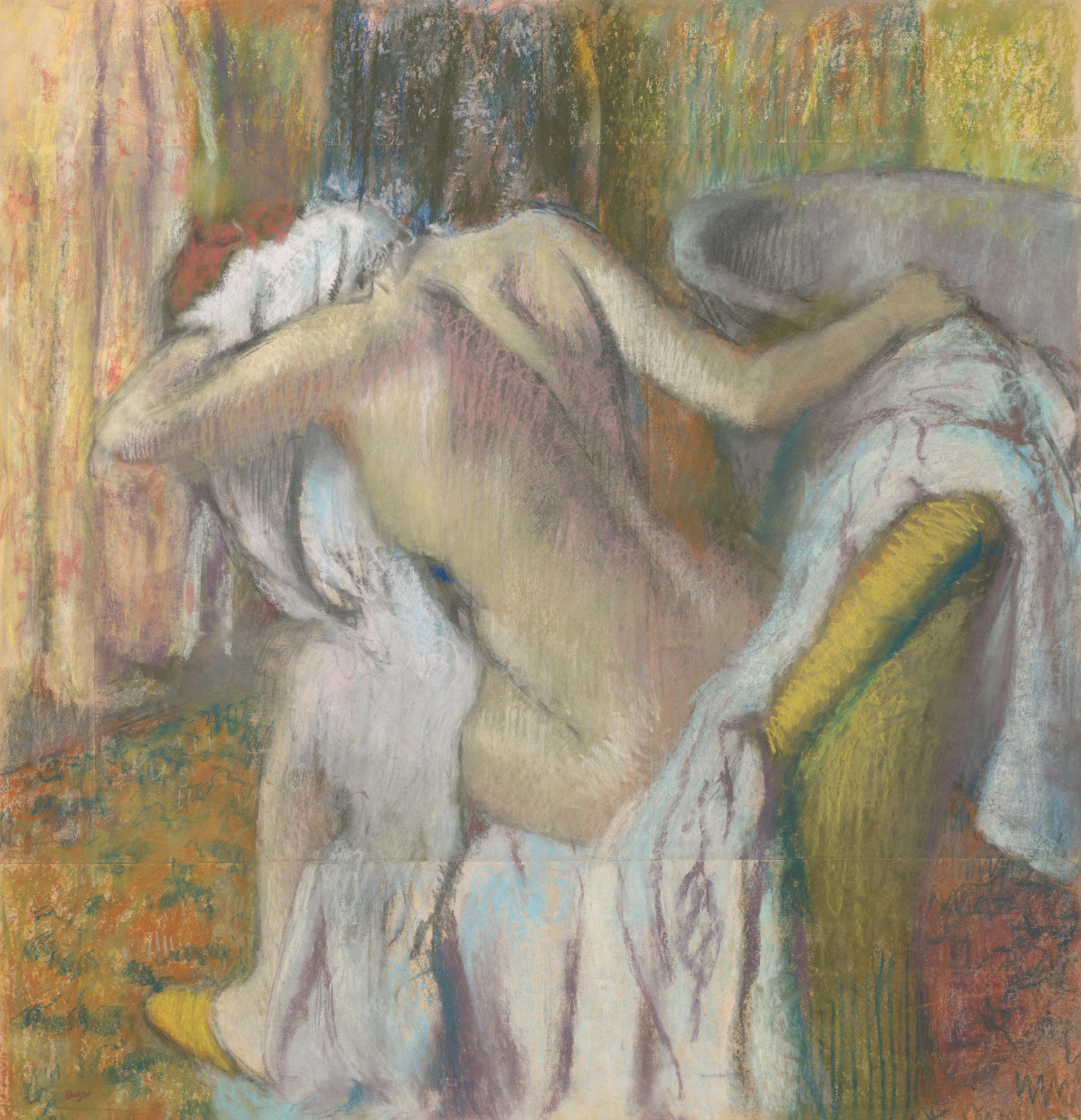
Edgar Degas' After the Bath, Woman Drying Herself (1890-1895)

Edgar Degas's initial interest in prostitutes, in the years 1876–1890, started with his interest in Edmond de Goncourt's novel La Fille Elisa (1877). In 1876–77, Degas filled a sketchbook with illustrations from de Goncourt's novel depicting scenes of a girl who becomes a prostitute with her soldier lover. Following soon after, Degas began illustrating the monotypes of brothel scenes, drawing the same physical type as the illustrations in his sketchbook. Although Degas drew individual prostitutes in a notebook, his actual monotypes were entire brothel scenes.

Several scholars have tried to identify a literary source of Degas' fifty-some brothel monotypes, but none have found a direct connection. However, there have been parallels to Huysman's Marthe, histoire d'une fille (1876), and in Émile Zola's Nana (1880). Although the prostitution themes of the novels and of Degas' monotypes have similarities, there is a difference between the treatment of the subject; while Degas' prostitutes are "earthy, ugly creatures", the novelists tend to depict their prostitutes as more "heroic and noble".

One of the more recently notable exhibitions that displayed several of Degas' monotypes was the Museum of Modern Art's "Edgar Degas: A Strange New Beauty" in 2016. "The exhibition includes approximately 120 rarely seen monotypes—along with some 60 related paintings, drawings, pastels, sketchbooks, and prints—that show Degas at his most modern, capturing the spirit of urban life; depicting the body in new and daring ways; liberating mark-making from tradition; and boldly engaging the possibilities of abstraction." One of the works that was displayed in the exhibit, After the Bath III (1891–92), is a lithograph that illustrates a woman stepping out of a bath.

Critics have tried to interpret Degas' scenes involving prostitutes and understand them. On one hand, many argue that, "rather than being victims of an intrusive gaze or performers in a sexual economy, the women depicted in Degas' [bathing] works are simply alone and unobserved. The works... are depicted from a perspective, but that perspective is not relevant to the fictional content of the work". In other words, Degas "did not exhibit the customary male dominance and instead created images of women who are involved with their own bodies without regard for a male viewer". Female art critics that wrote about this and argued for this include Carol Armstrong, Norma Broude, Wendy Lesser and Eunice Lipton. On the contrary, authors such as Anthea Callen, Hollis Clayson and Heather Dawkins argue that Degas "embodied the dominant masculinity of his era". Specifically, Anthea Callen has argued that "all of Degas' Bathers imply a notional "keyhole" viewpoint such that the works become inscribed with the gaze of a male voyeur. Even in works that are structured so as to provide multiple perspectives or unusual angles on the principal subject in a way that calls into question the embodied viewpoint of a fictional observer, Callen suggests that the 'discursive significance' of such a point of view remains pivotal in understanding the works' sexual and social implications. For Callen, even though the works are not set up pornographically, the implied gaze of a male spectator intrudes on the scene and becomes central to comprehension of the works' content by the viewer."

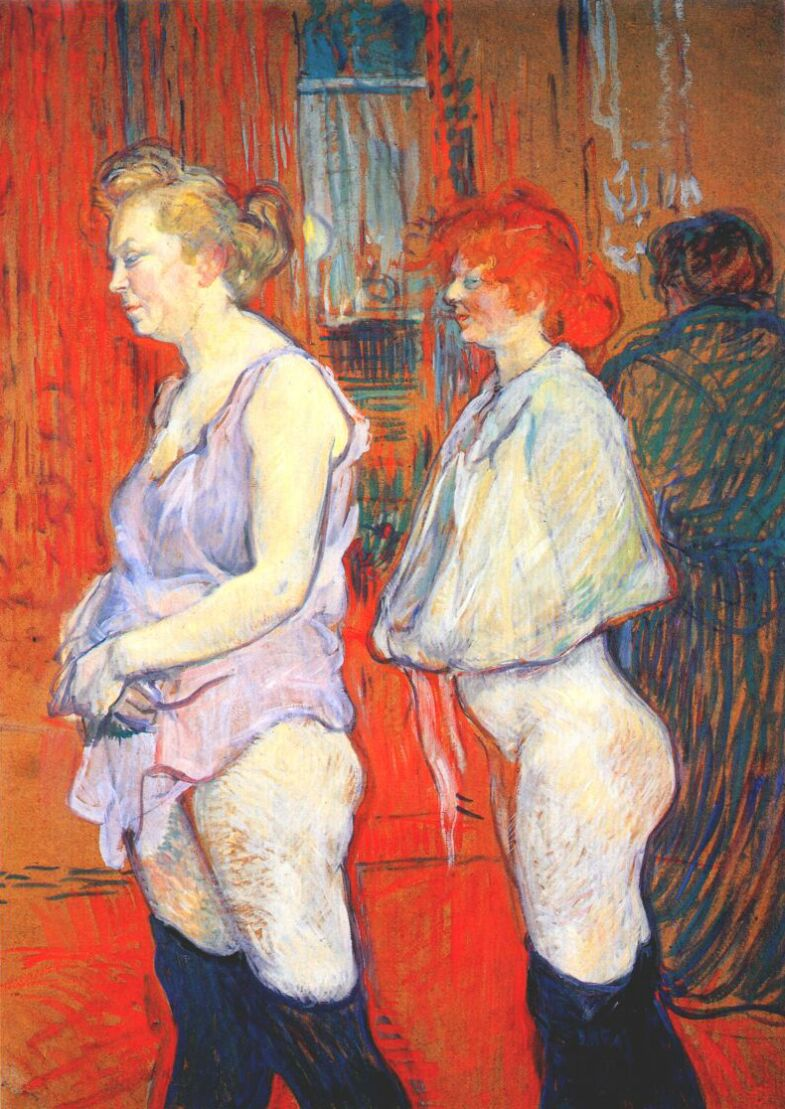
Toulouse Lautrec The Medical Inspection

=== Henri de Toulouse-Lautrec: Elles and other works ===
Toulouse Lautrec was known for his famous paintings of prostitutes. He visited the Moulin Rouge and other cabarets in the district of Montmartre in Paris. He began by just sketching the women but then as time progressed, Lautrec started painting them as well. His paintings were more of a documentary of the life of these woman rather than objectifying them. La Toilette (1889) depicts a woman, probably a prostitute, sitting on the floor, surrounded by sheets who has either just finished bathing or is about to start. In The Sofa (1896) Lautrec shows two prostitutes resting on the couch; they are both wearing slips and look exhausted. This could show that they just finished working for a client, or that they are taking breaks between jobs.The Medical Inspection (1894) is a painting that depicts a reality many prostitutes faced; the dreaded medical inspections. Sexually transmitted diseases were common during this time because of ineffective and unavailable (except to the very rich) treatment. Toulouse Lautrec captured this phenomenon perfectly; he does not glamorize their profession. The two women are standing with their dresses pulled up as if they know what they are about to experience.
