= Seirō Jūnitoki =

Series of woodblock prints by Kitagawa Utamaro

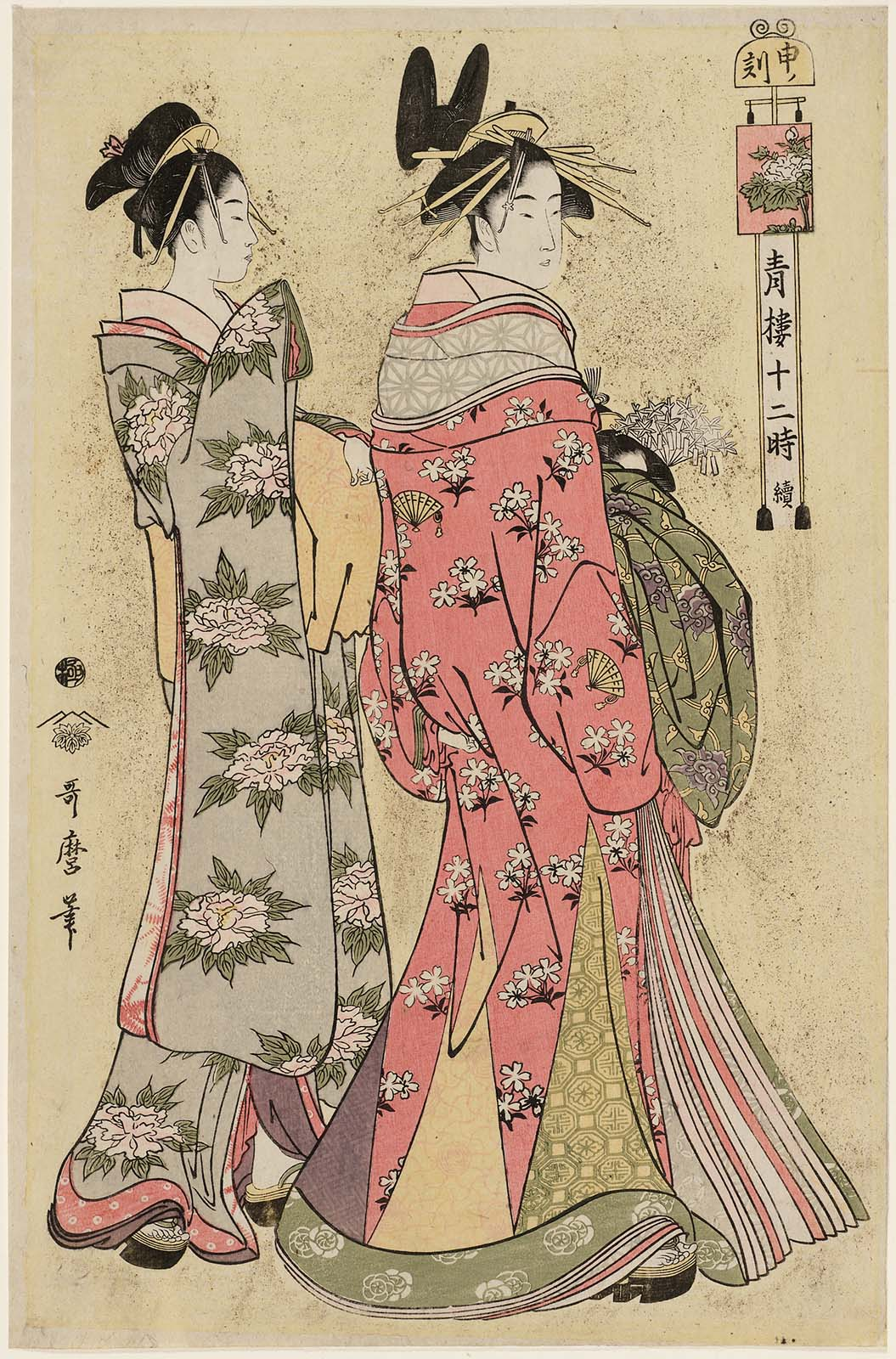
Saru no koku ("Hour of the Monkey")

Seirō Jūnitoki Tsuzuki (青楼十二時 続, "Twelve Hours in Yoshiwara" (Note: This is neither a literal nor official translation; other translations include "Twelve Hours in the Gay Quarters", "Twelve Hours of the Blue Towers", and "The Twelve Hours of the Green Houses")) is a series of twelve ukiyo-e prints designed by the Japanese artist Utamaro and published in c. 1794. They depict scenes of courtesans in the Yoshiwara pleasure district at each hour of the twelve-hour traditional Japanese time system.

== Description and analysis ==
The series was published in c. 1794 by Tsutaya Jūzaburō. The multicolour nishiki-e prints are in ōban size, about 37 by 24 centimetres (15 in × 9 in). (Note: Precise sizes vary, and paper was often trimmed after printing.)

Seirō (青楼, "green house[s]") refers to the yūkaku licensed pleasure quarters—specifically Yoshiwara. The term seirō originated in Chinese to denote a pavilion in which a nobleman kept a mistress; in Utamaro's time it referred to Yoshiwara's most privileged pleasure houses.

The series depicts a day in Yoshiwara, beginning with a morning-after sequence at the sunrise Hour of the Hare on the twelve-hour traditional Japanese time system, on which each toki unit lasted two modern hours. The titles appear in a caption shaped as a Japanese clock in a corner of each print. Though many of the prints show courtesans in the midst of entertainment, the male visitors do not appear, leaving it to purchasers of the prints to imagine themselves in the role of customer. The scenes are framed as if in candid moments, but are designed for the benefit of the male gaze, as no matter the place, hour, or state of exhaustion, the women maintain their beauty.

=== U no koku ===
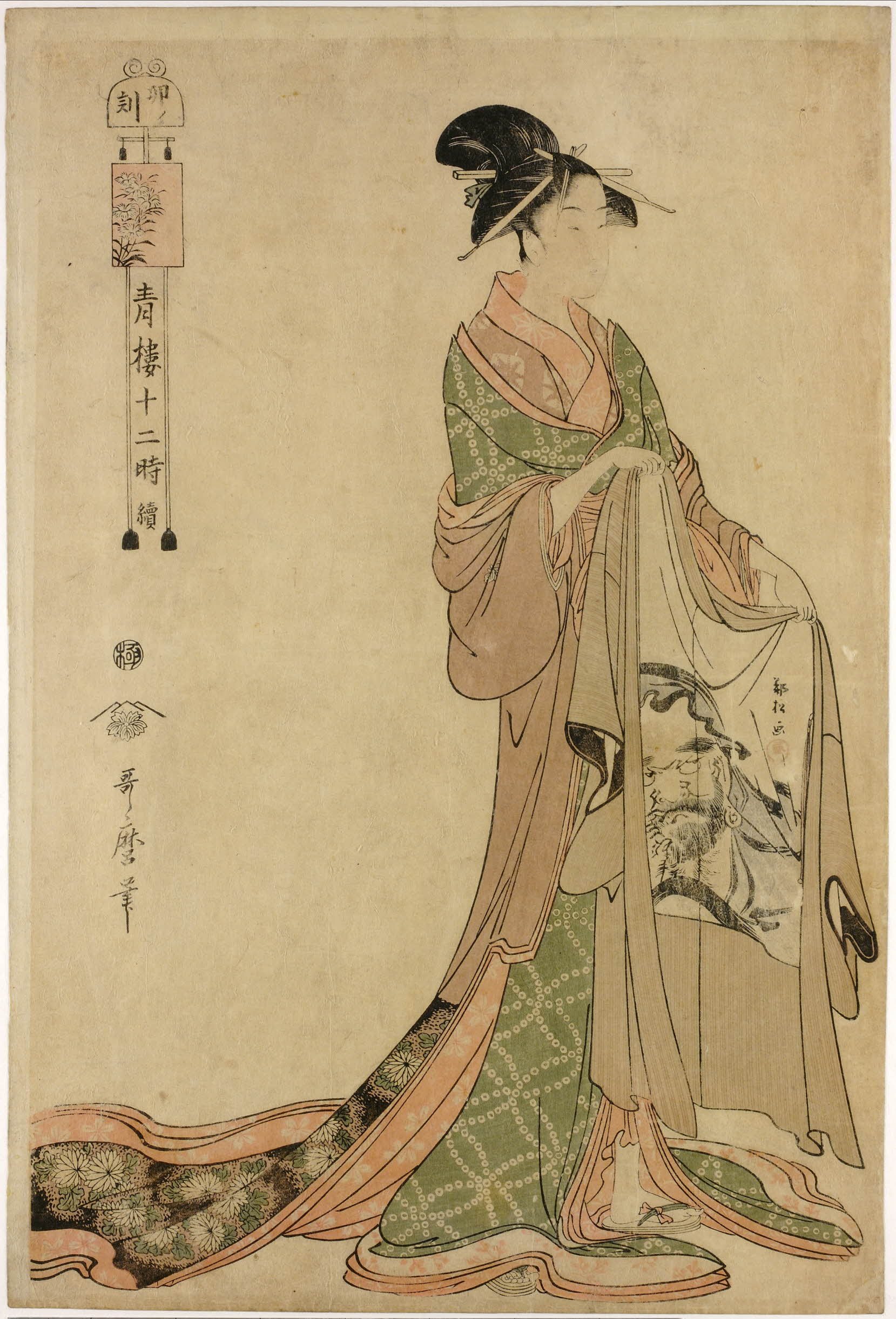

U no koku (卯の刻) is the Hour of the Rabbit, about 6:00 in the morning.

=== Tatsu no koku ===
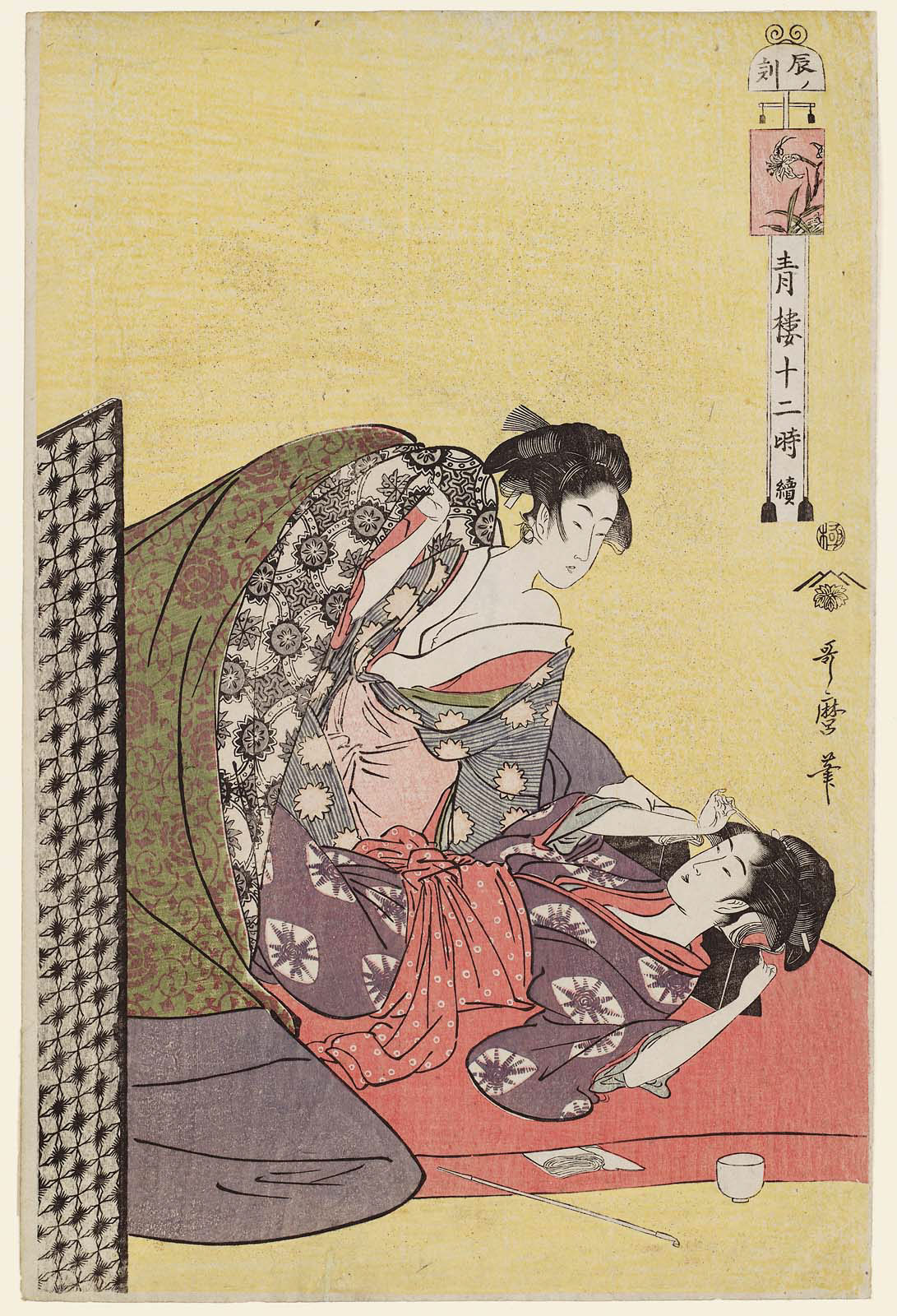

Tatsu no koku (辰ノ刻) is the Hour of the Dragon, about 8:00 in the morning. Two courtesans are taking to their beds at this early hour, their exhaustion signified by their disheveled clothes and hair. It is unlikely their customers would see them in such a state and at such an hour.

=== Mi no koku ===
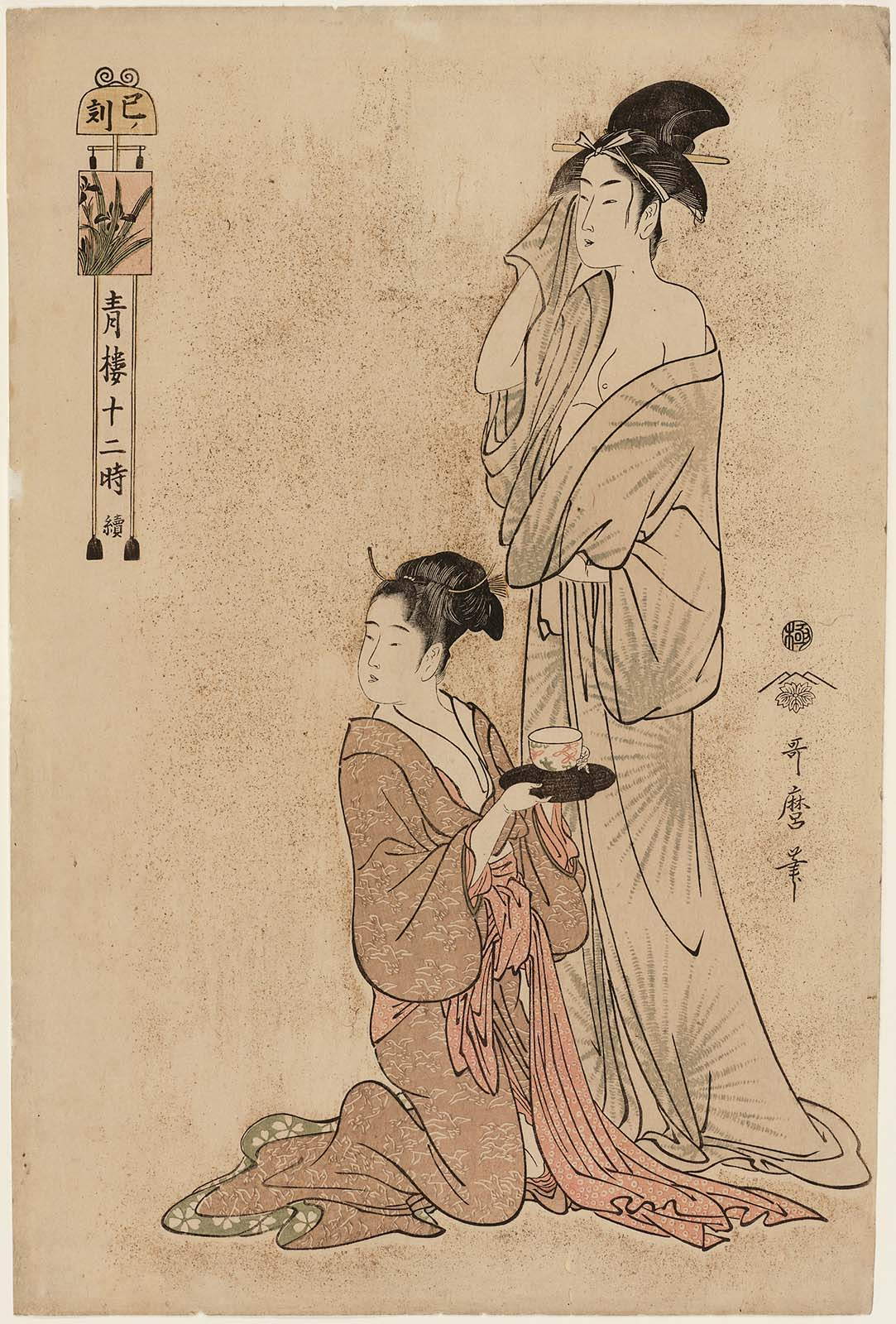

Mi no koku (巳ノ刻) is the Hour of the Snake, about 10:00 in the morning.

=== Uma no koku ===
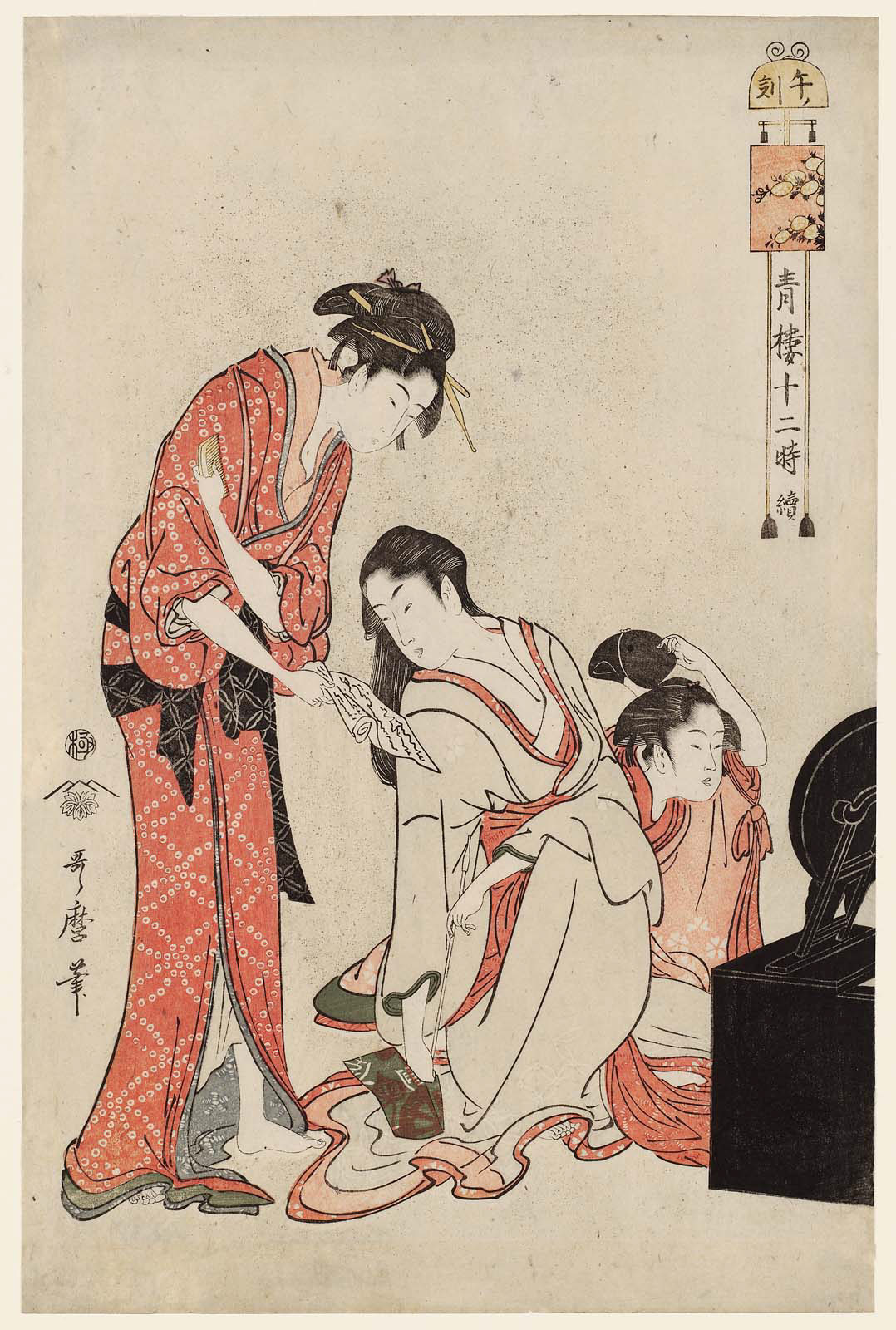

Uma no koku (午ノ刻) is the Hour of the Horse, about 12:00 midday.

=== Hitsuji no koku ===
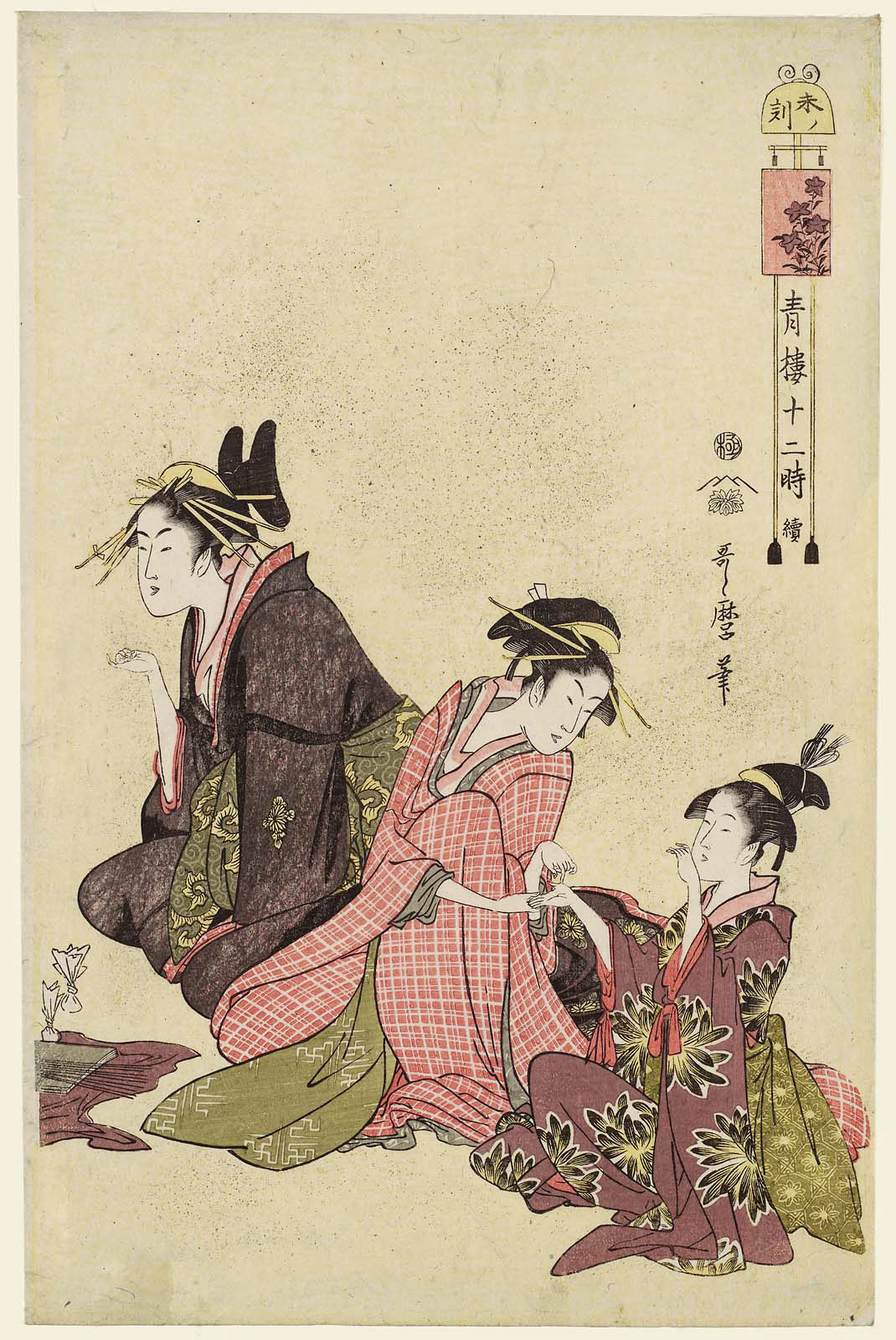

Hitsuji no koku (未ノ刻) is the Hour of the Goat, about 2:00 in the afternoon. This would likely be just before the hiru-mise (Note: 昼見世 hiru-mise) afternoon display of prostitutes.

At left lies a pile of bamboo divining sticks, suggesting the courtesans are visiting a fortune teller, in which case the small wrapped packages on the floor by the sticks would be offerings of money to the teller. The new, (Note: Ōkubo calls the middle figure a 新造 shinzō—a yet-inexperienced prostitute or attendant to an older prostitute.) young courtesan in the middle appears to be explaining how palm-reading works to the kamuro at the right.

=== Saru no koku ===
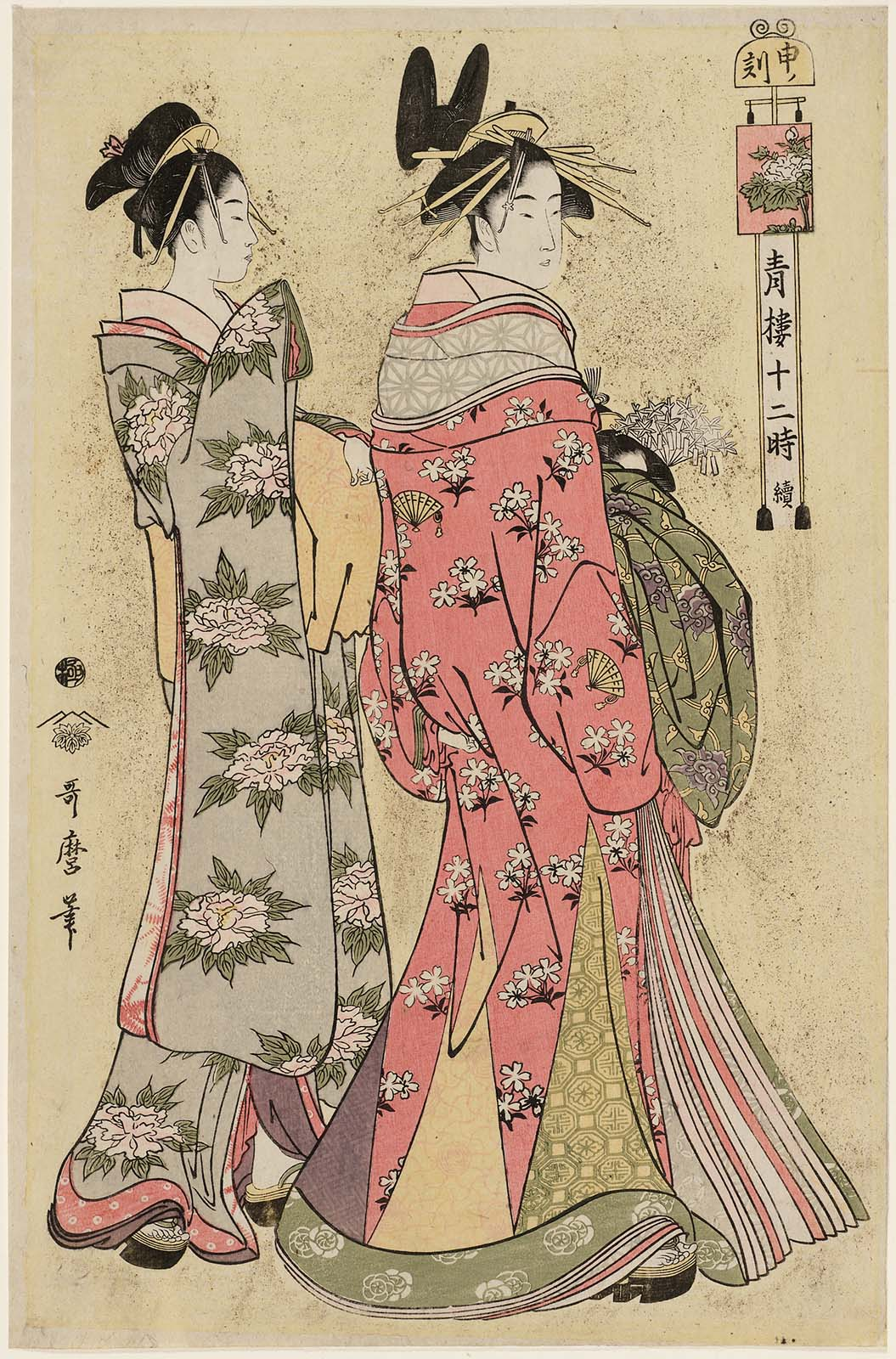

Saru no koku (申ノ刻) is the Hour of the Monkey, about 4:00 in the afternoon.

=== Tori no koku ===
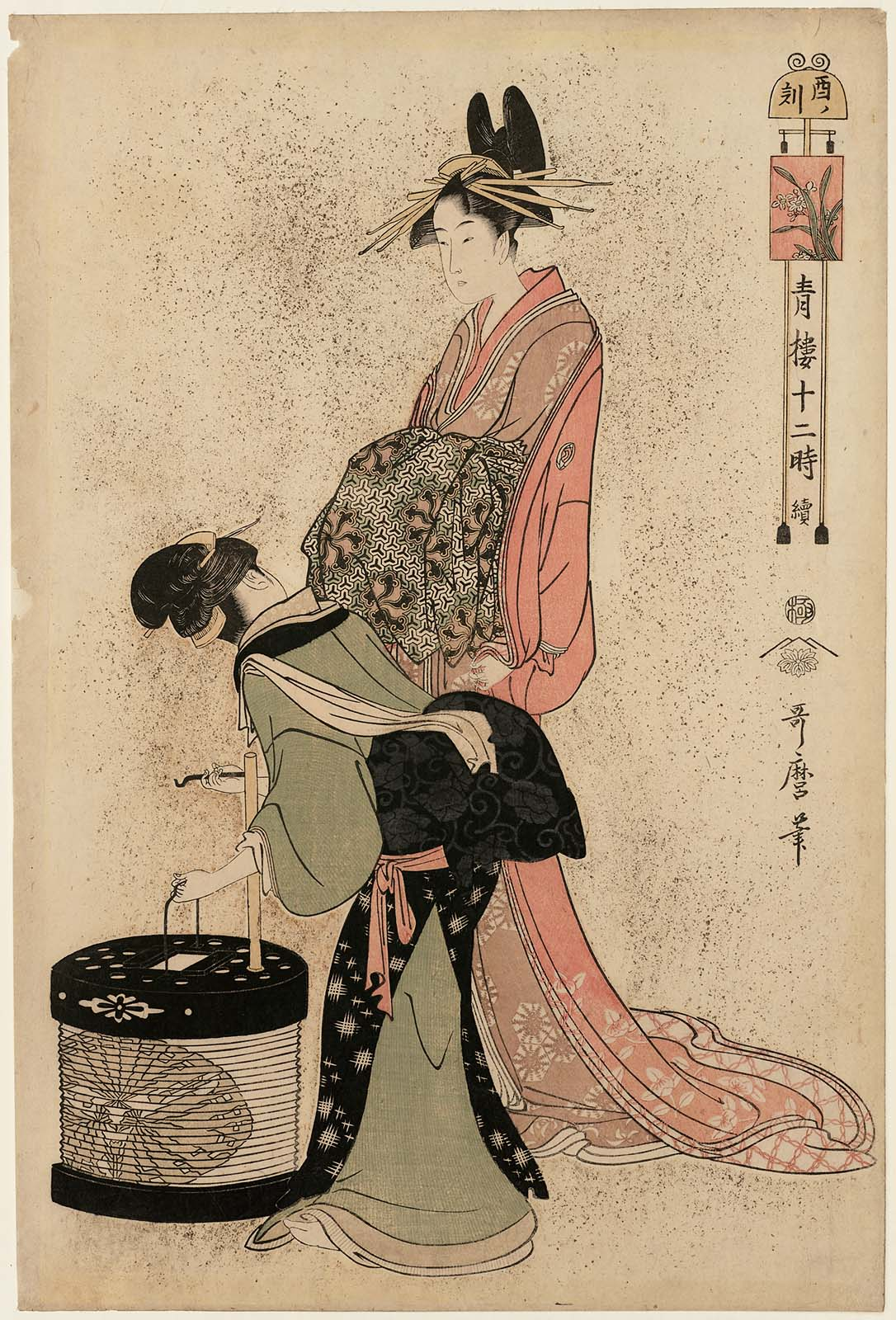

Tori no koku (酉ノ刻) is the Hour of the Rooster, about 6:00 in the evening.

=== Inu no koku ===
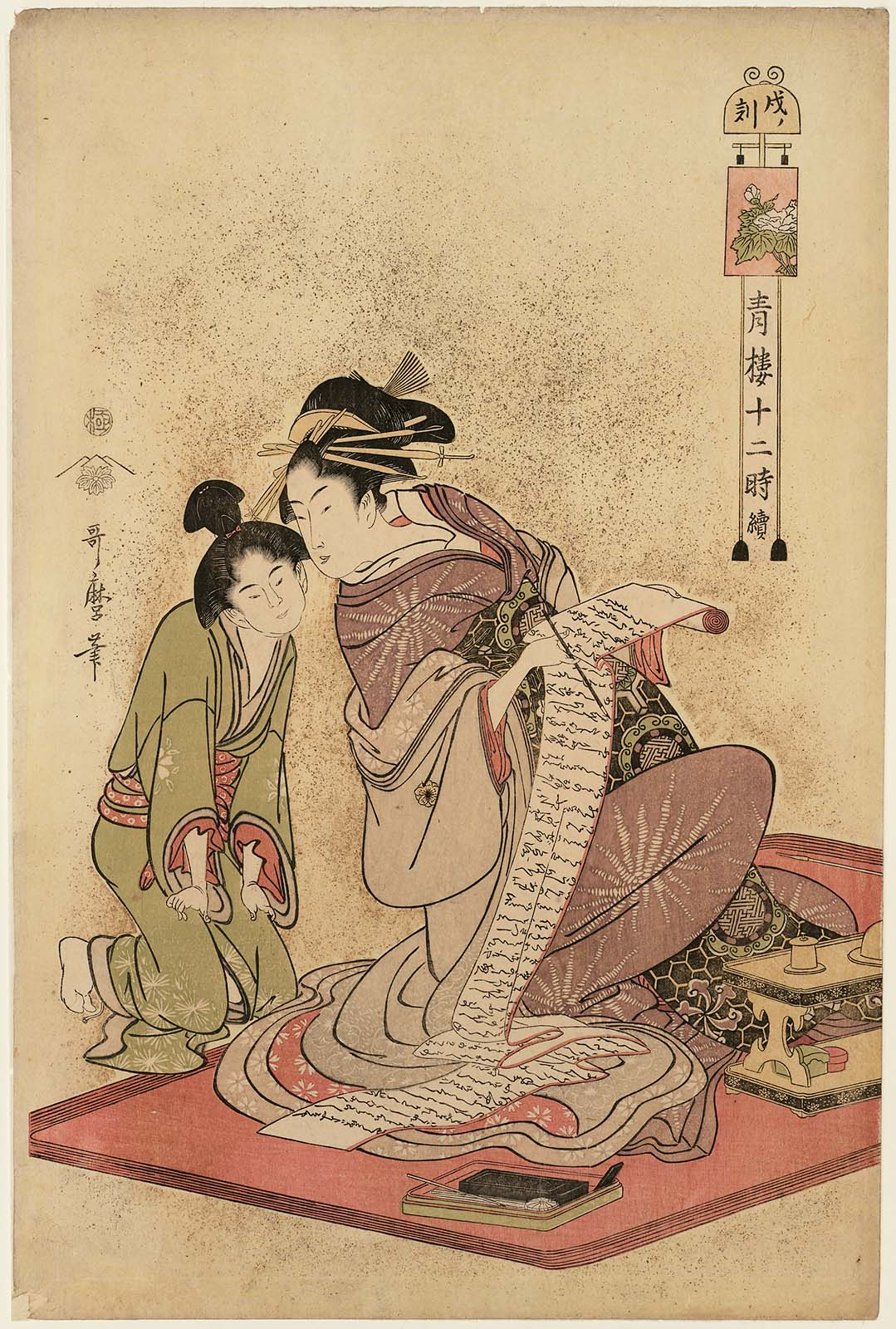

Inu no koku (戌ノ刻) is the Hour of the Dog, about 8:00 in the evening.

A courtesan sits on a scarlet felt rug, perhaps in a harimise, where prostitutes sat on display. She writes a letter on a long scroll; courtesans were expected to write to patrons. She bends back in a half-rising posture to whisper into the ear of a kamuro, a young girl who works as a courtesan's servant. Before the courtesan sits a luxurious tobacco tray decorated with makie.

=== I no koku ===
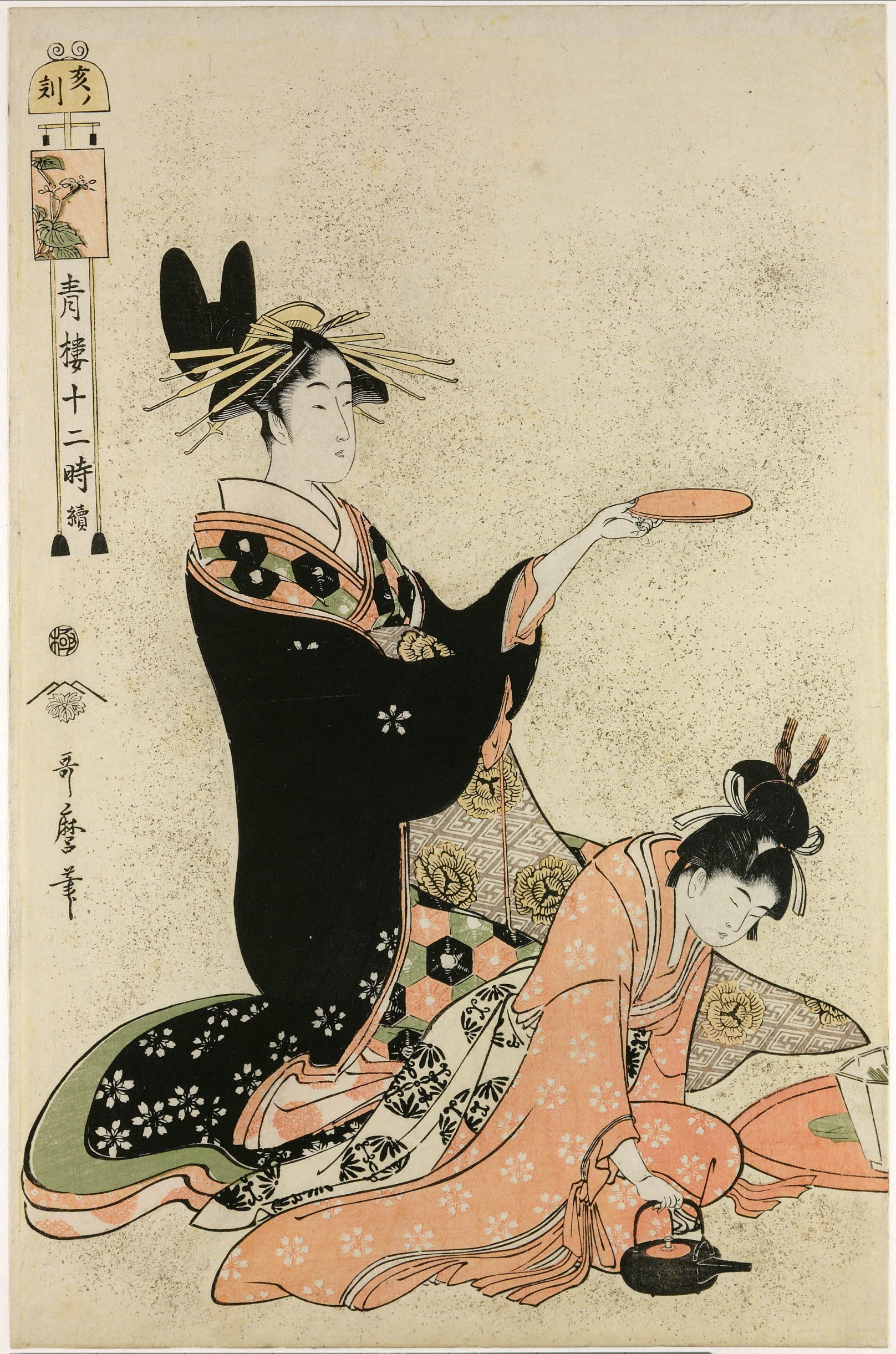

I no koku (亥ノ刻) is the Hour of the Pig, about 10:00 in the evening. At such a time, the courtesans are still entertaining their guests; the woman at the left sits erect, carrying a guest's saucer. To the right before her is a kamuro, a young girl who works as a courtesan's servant, who appears to be dozing off at such a late hour. The diagonals of the kamuro's posture and the courtesan's outstretched arm contribute to the balance in the composition.

=== Ne no koku ===
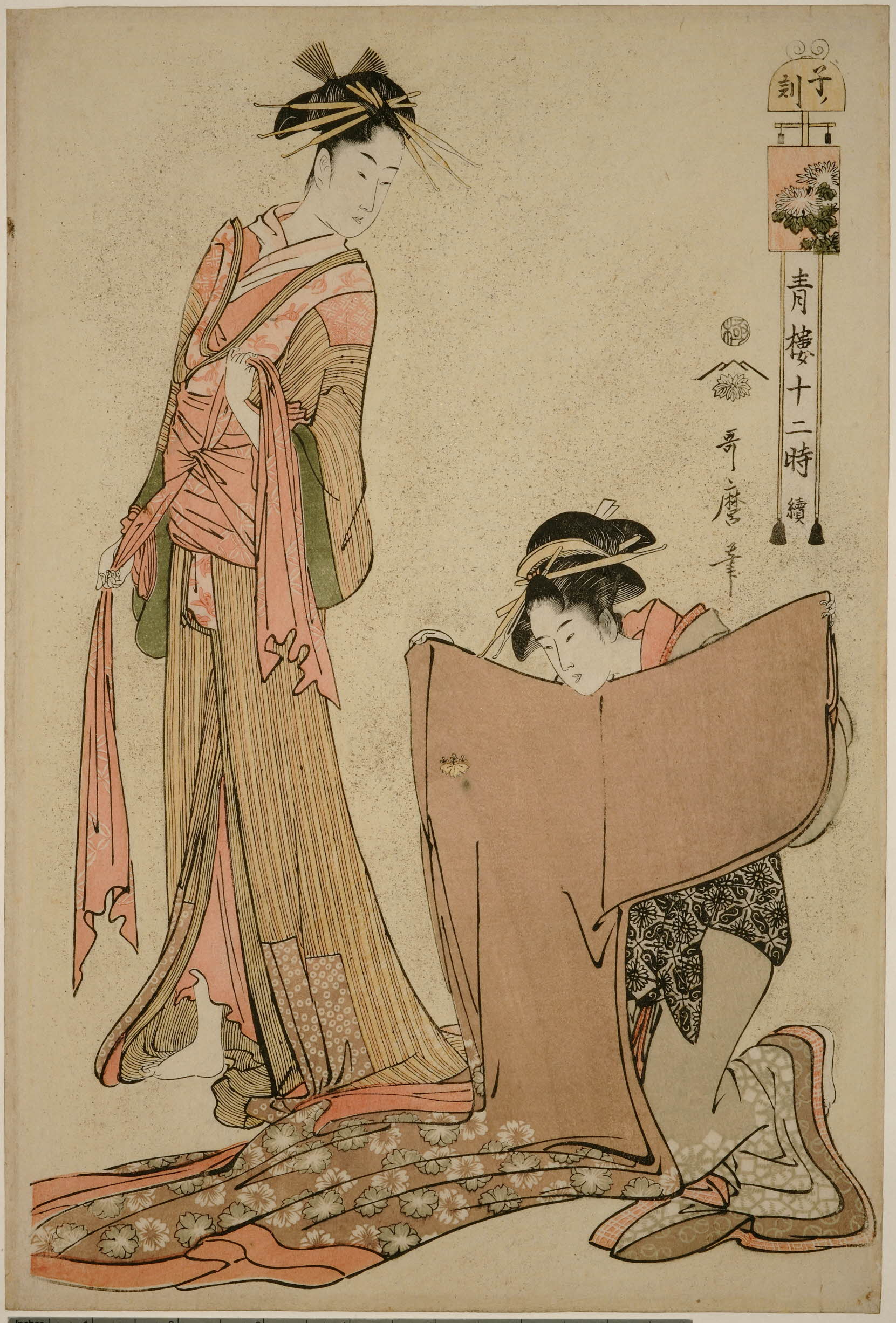

Ne no koku (子ノ刻) is the Hour of the Rat, about midnight. The two women in the print are preparing for bed after finishing with the night's festivities. The courtesan at the right has changed into simple nightclothes and is tightening her obi sash with both hands. In a half-rising posture she peers down at the woman to the left, who appears to be a young courtesan-in-training, is folding up the first woman's uchikake kimono with her chin and both hands.

=== Ushi no koku ===
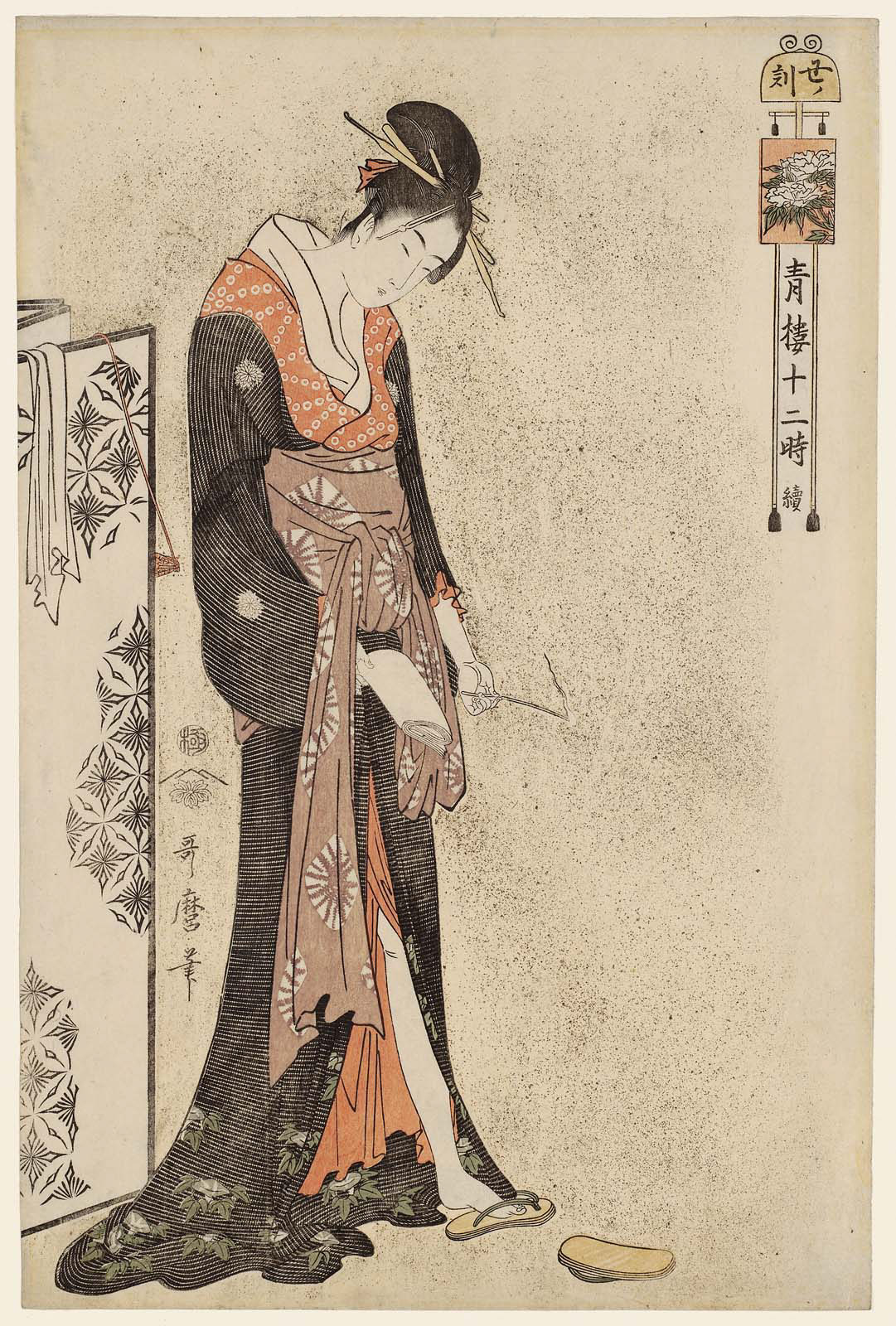

Ushi no koku (丑ノ刻) is the Hour of the Ox, about 2:00 in the morning. It is deep in the night—the woman in the print has finished her work and is in her nightclothes; the nape of her neck and her left leg protrude from her robe. She appears exhausted, and her hair hangs disheveled as her head droops. She holds some twisted paper string in her right hand, lit to light her way, and some kaishi paper in her left hand, as if on her way to the toilet. She is putting on some zōri sandals, the customary footwear for courtesans in the corridors of the pleasure houses of Yoshiwara. Her mamoribukuro charm pouch hangs from a byōbu folding screen at the viewer's right. Art historian Julie Nelson Davis notes that the print may be designed as a "sympathetic portrayal of an exhausted woman", though she "is rendered as an elegant form in a scene designed for the male gaze".

=== Tora no koku ===
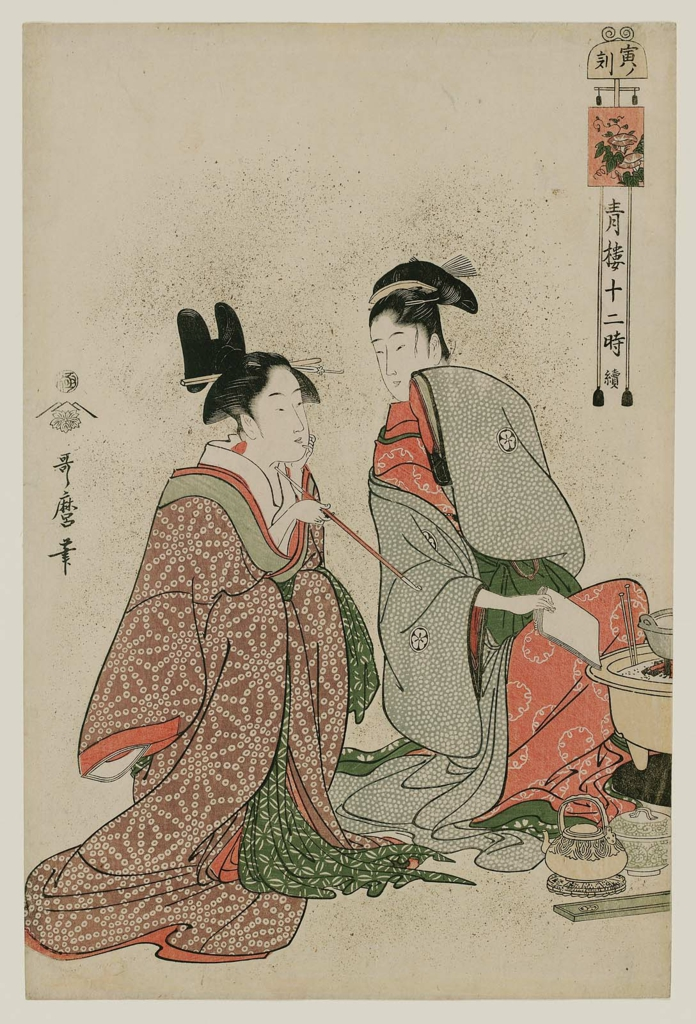

Tora no koku (寅ノ刻) is the Hour of the Tiger, about 4:00 in the morning. It was at such an after-work hour that courtesans could talk freely, often to badmouth the guests. Two courtesans sit and chat before a hibachi heater. They appear cold, with their arms withdrawn into their kimonos. The woman to the right fans the hibachi with a folded stack of kaishi paper.

== Legacy ==
The series is rare and highly prized amongst collectors. The French art critic Edmond de Goncourt considered Seirō Jūnitoki Utamaro's "most visually appealing" series.

Seirō Jūnitoki inspired the French painter Henri de Toulouse-Lautrec's lithographic portfolio Elles.
