= Woman in a Tub (Degas) =

Pastel by Edgar Degas

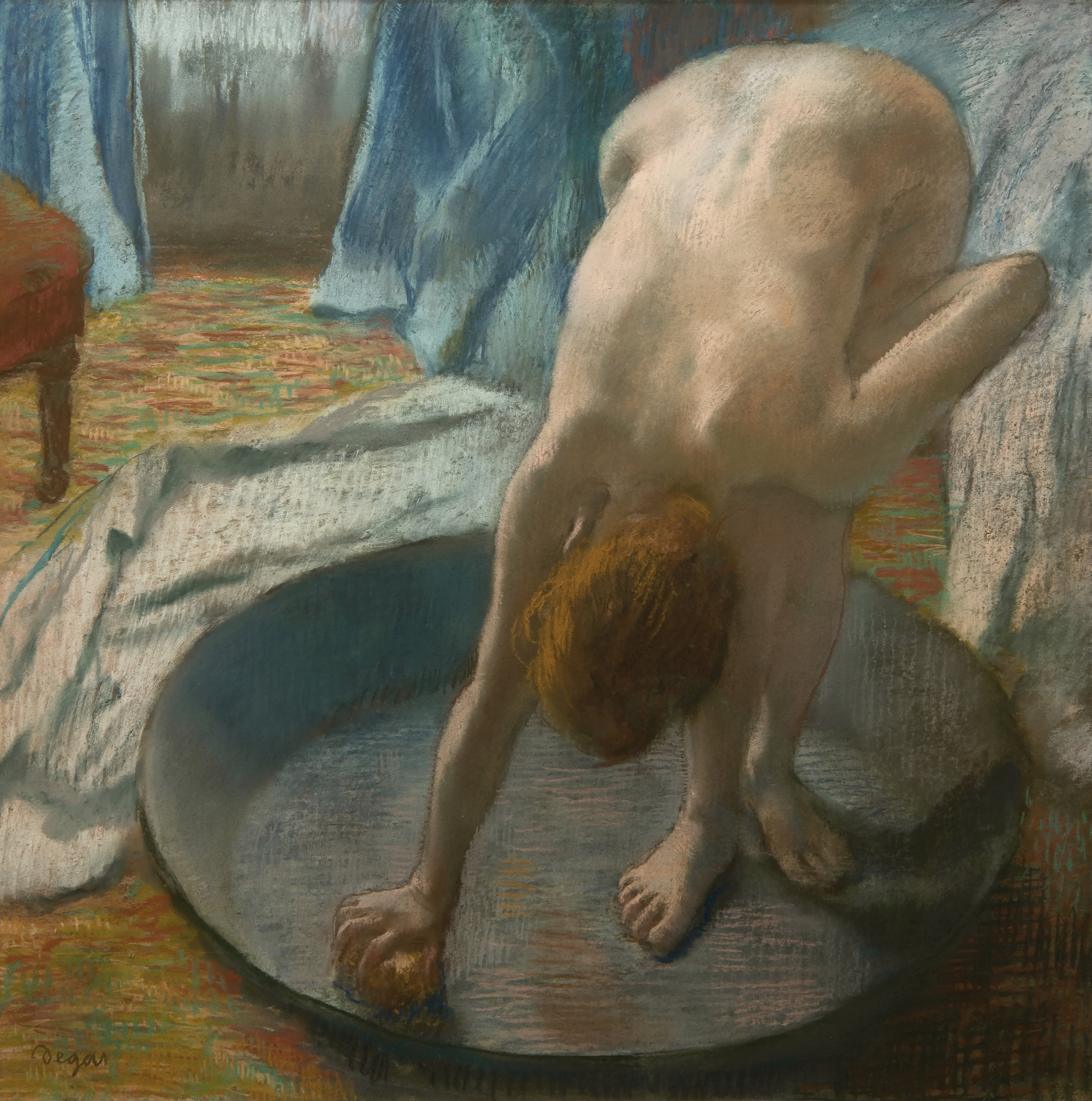
- Artist: Edgar Degas
- Year: 1886
- Type: pastel on blue-grey paper
- Dimensions: 69.9 cm × 69.9 cm (27.5 in × 27.5 in)
- Location: Hill–Stead Museum, Farmington, Connecticut

Woman in a Tub (or The Tub) is one of a suite of pastels on paper created by the French painter Edgar Degas in the 1880s and is in the collection of the Hill-Stead Museum in Connecticut. The suite of pastels all featured nude women "bathing, washing, drying, wiping themselves, combing their hair or having it combed" and were created in readiness for the eighth and final Impressionist Exhibition of 1886.

The work demonstrates Degas' mastery of pastel drawing and, like the other works in the suite, portrays a woman engaged in a mundane private activity, in this case spongeing down her bathtub. The same bathtub featured in several of the works in the series and, together with the model's red hair, suggested the women were of the working class, possibly even prostitutes, In their defence Degas retorted "my women are simple, honest creatures who are concerned with nothing beyond their physical occupations... it is as if you were looking through a keyhole" emphasising the innocence of the models and the voyeurism of the predominantly male viewing public.

== Associated works ==
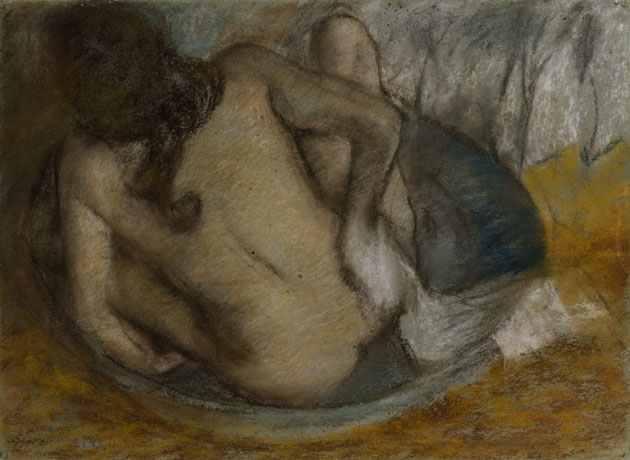
Woman in a tub, 1884, Glasgow Museums

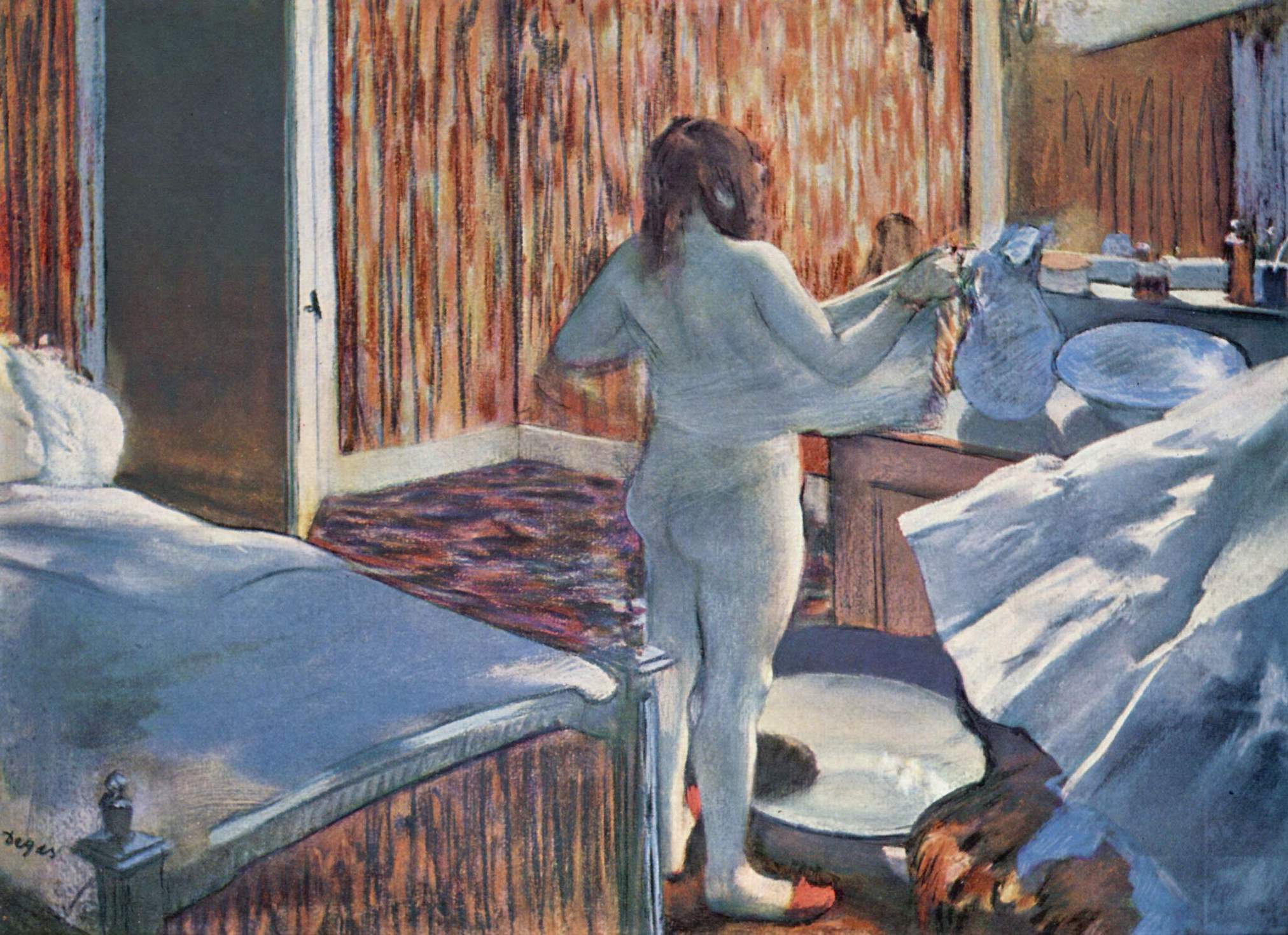
Woman Drying Herself after the Bath, c.1885, Norton Simon Museum, California

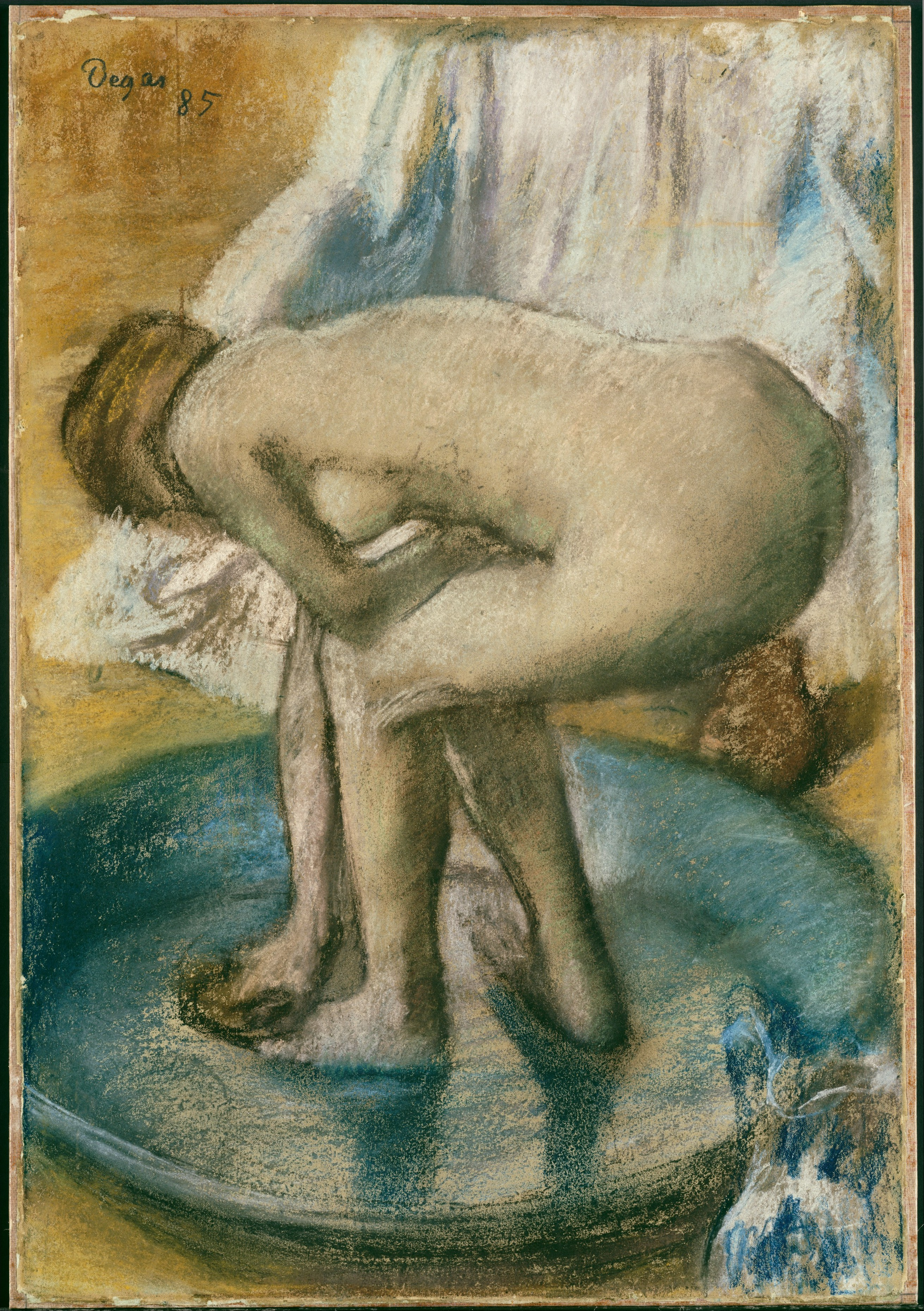
Woman Bathing in a Shallow Tub, 1885, Metropolitan Museum of Art, New York

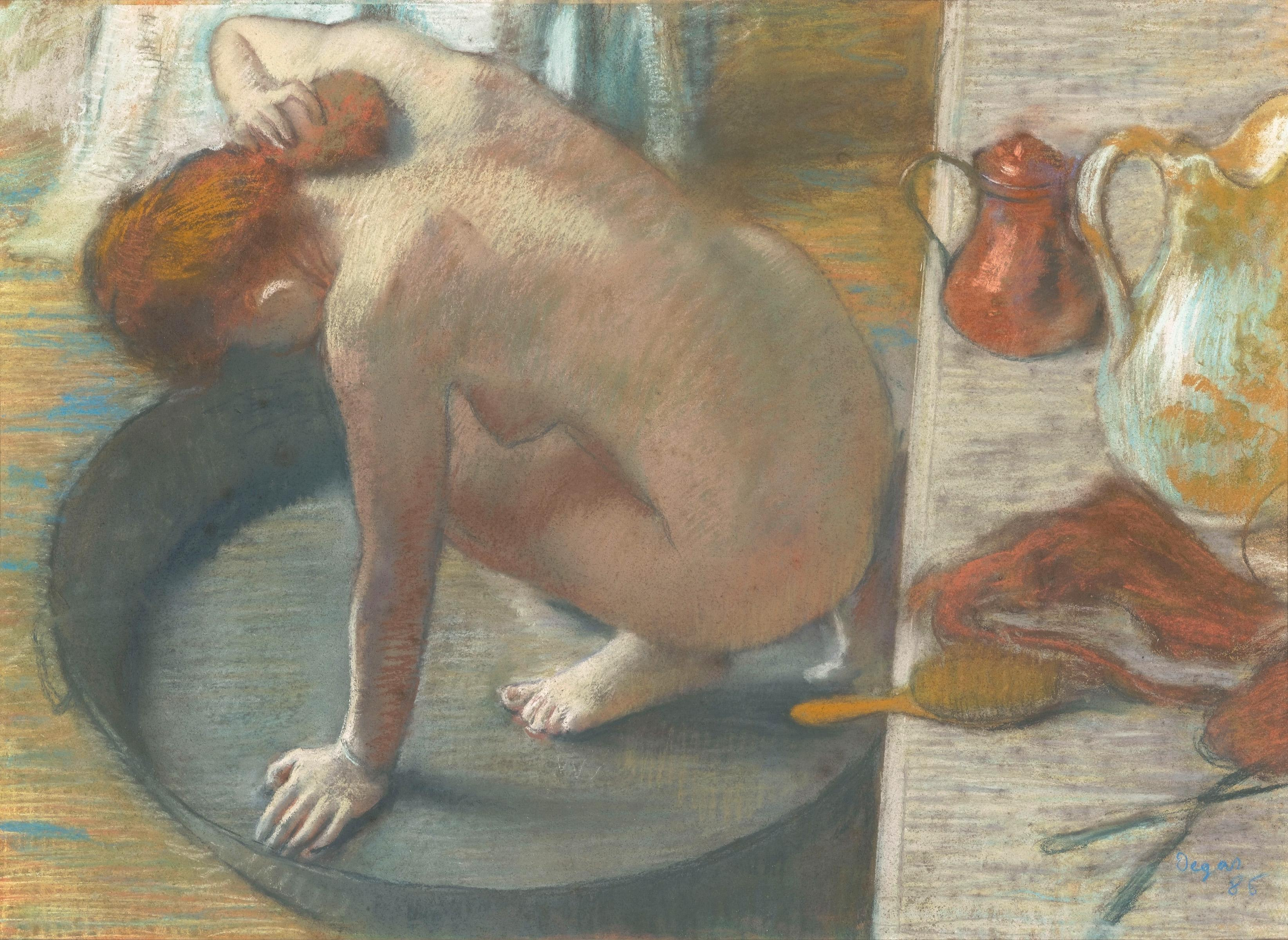
The Tub, 1886, Musee d'Orsay

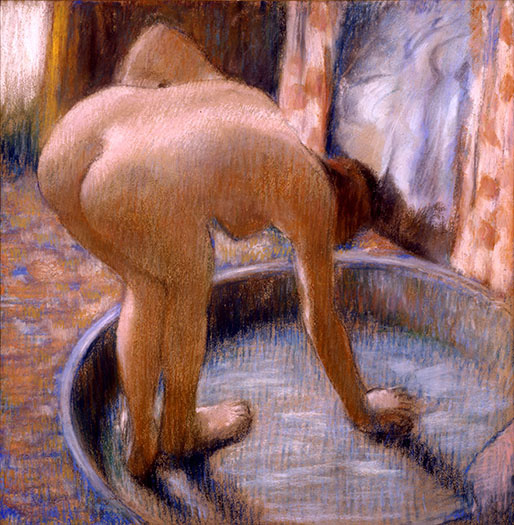
A Woman in the Tub, 1886–1891, Hiroshima Museum of Art

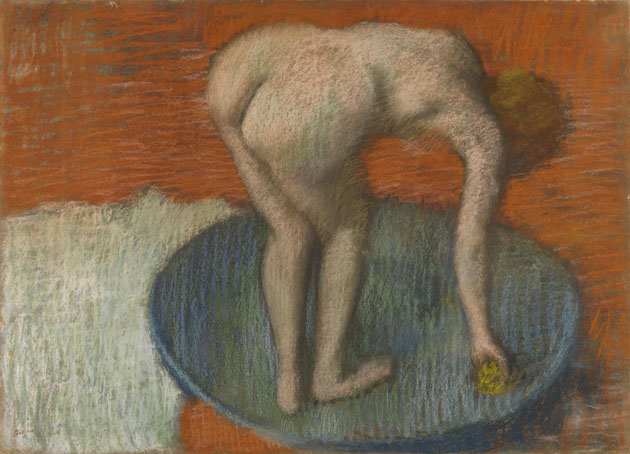
Woman in a Tub, 1886–1891, Glasgow Museums

== See also ==
- 100 Great Paintings, 1980 BBC series
