= La Blanchisseuse (Toulouse-Lautrec) =

Painting by Henri de Toulouse-Lautrec

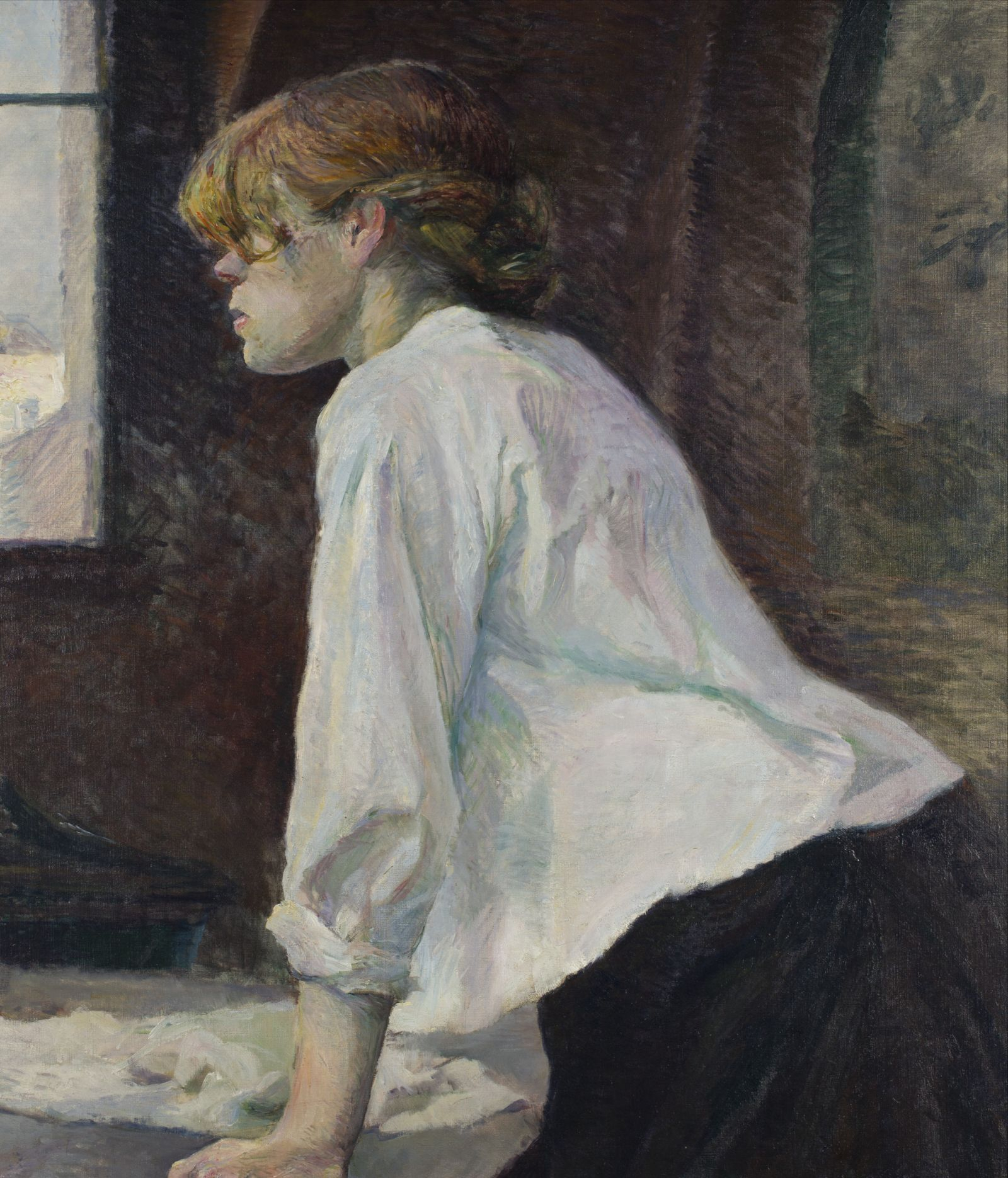
- Artist: Henri de Toulouse-Lautrec
- Year: 1886
- Type: Oil paint on canvas
- Dimensions: 93 by 75 centimetres (37 in × 30 in)
- Location: Private collection

La Blanchisseuse (French: [la blɑ̃ʃisøz], The Laundress) is an 1886 oil-on-canvas painting by French artist Henri de Toulouse-Lautrec. In November 2005, it was sold for US$22.4 million at auction by Christie's.

La Blanchisseuse was painted by Toulouse-Lautrec and posed for by Carmen Gaudin (Note: Carmen Gaudin (1866?–1920) was a French laundress and model who appeared in more than 15 of Lautrec's paintings.) in 1886. This painting showcases the gritty life and working conditions endured by the working classes throughout the 19th century. The subject of laundresses, also known as washerwomen, was a popular one in art, especially in France. The subject is also consistent with Toulouse-Lautrec's interest in depicting marginalized groups such as dancers, prostitutes, and circus performers.

The painting was in storage until 2005, when an anonymous buyer acquired it for 22.4 million dollars, breaking the record for the most expensive Lautrec painting sold at an auction.
