= The Tub =

1886 pastel drawing by Edgar Degas

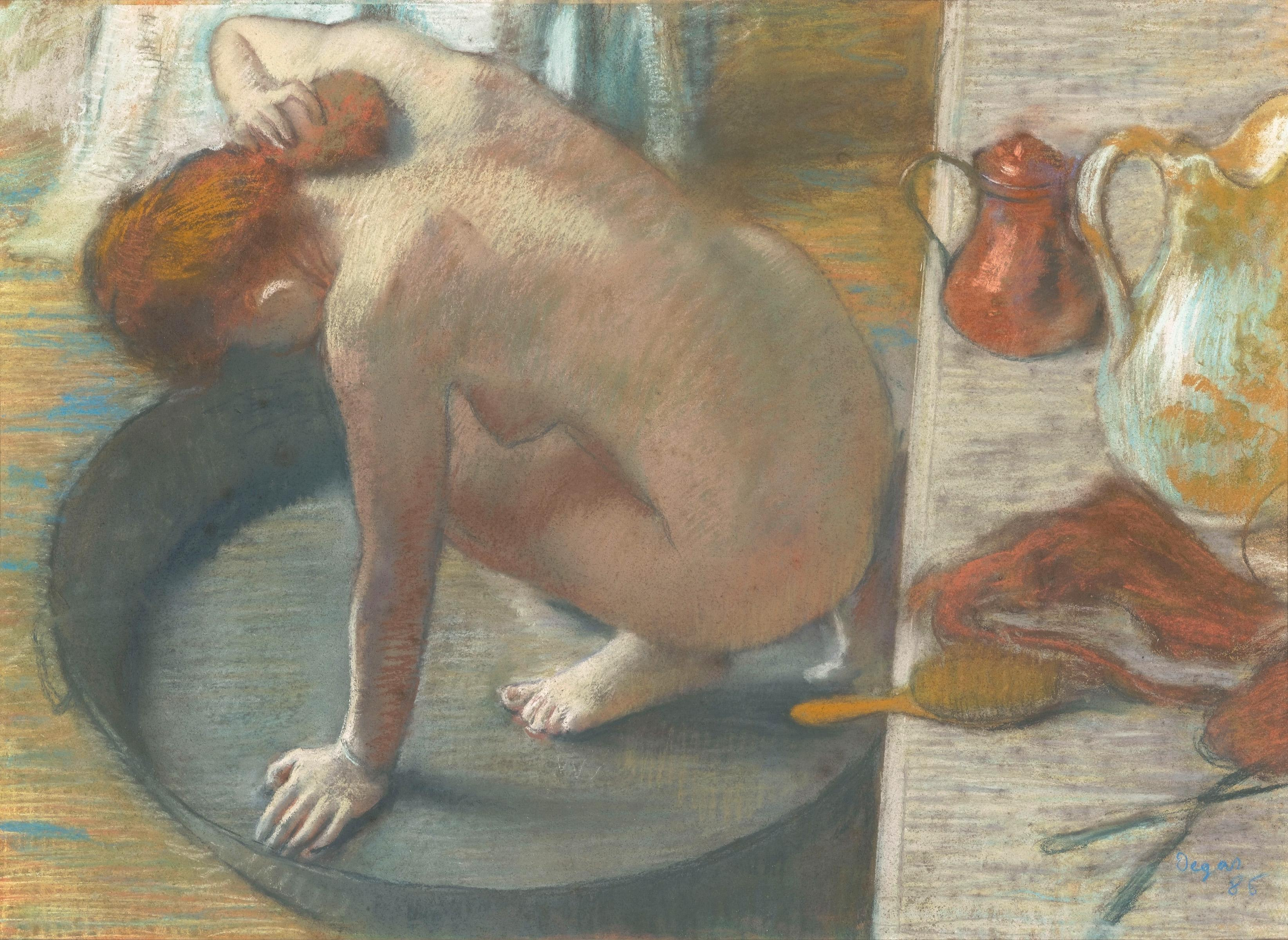
- Artist: Edgar Degas
- Year: 1886
- Medium: Pastel on heavy wove paper
- Movement: Impressionism
- Dimensions: 60 cm × 83 cm (24 in × 33 in)
- Location: Musée d'Orsay, Paris

The Tub (Woman Bathing in a Shallow Tub) is an 1886 pastel drawing on heavy wove paper by the French artist Edgar Degas. The work depicts a nude woman crouched in a shallow tub, illuminated by early morning light as she bathes. It is one of seven pastels Degas created in the mid-1880s showing women bathing or drying themselves in private interiors. He exhibited The Tub alongside the related nudes at the Eighth Impressionist Exhibition in 1886, where the group was regarded as one of the highlights of the show.

The composition is marked by the angled edge of a cupboard or dressing table, whose objects interrupt the rounded form of the bather and heighten the impression of an incidental glimpse. Critics responded in varied ways, though reception leaned largely positive: many praised the pastel's realism, beauty, and technical refinement, and several drew classical comparisons, while a few critics expressed discomfort with Degas's unconventional treatment of the nude. In 1908, the pastel was donated to the Louvre, where it was first displayed in 1914. With the founding of the Musée d'Orsay, the work was transferred to that museum, where it is housed today.

== Context ==
During the late nineteenth century, pastels primarily attracted the interest of private collectors. Degas, however, broke from convention by exhibiting his paintings, pastels, and drawings on an equal footing. Although he initially used pastel as a medium for sketching, it became his preferred form of expression by the 1880s—the period in which The Tub was created. This development reflected not only his technical ingenuity but also practical considerations, as pastels were both less costly to produce and easier to sell. Degas quickly came to appreciate the expressive potential of colored chalks, and in his series of bathing women, pastel ultimately supplanted oil paint and monotype as his principal medium.

== Composition and analysis ==
The figure is illuminated by a soft, cool morning light that fills the chamber with a bluish glow, emphasizing the woman's back, shoulders, and arms. Lillian Schacherl notes the fineness and delicacy of Degas's pastel lines, drawing the viewer's attention to the green, yellow, and red threads of the rug, the streaks of blue and orange in the reflective surface of the shallow water, and the dense white texture of the towel. Gary Tinterow observes that this cool tonality is reinforced by Degas's complete coverage of the paper support in pastel, and that the forms are smoothly modeled, their details articulated through graceful curvature and softness.

Bernd Growe notes that although the surface is composed of fine, delicate strokes, Degas nevertheless abandons the traditional academic role of line as a fixed contour, instead building form through chromatic hatching and textured color zones. Carol Armstrong similarly observes that the color and texture of the nude oscillate between description and abstraction, pulling away from chiaroscuro and firm contours and dissolving into floating fields of pastel hatchings. She argues that these effects distance the image from straightforward visual or local description, moving instead toward a tactile sensitivity to form.

Scholars have also devoted significant attention to the work's compositional structure. Supporting herself with her left hand and raising a sponge to her neck with her right, the figure is placed beside the vertical edge of a cupboard or dressing table. Keith Roberts indicates that the hard, tilted line of this form intensifies the sense of an unpremeditated, chance glimpse, positioning the viewer above her as though pausing momentarily in a doorway. At the same time, the severity of this edge is tempered by the still-life arrangement atop the dresser—two jugs, a wig, curling tongs, and a hairbrush—whose colors and shapes echo the body's rhythms. Growe observes that Degas aligns the edge of the chest so precisely with the picture plane that, without the handles of the pot and the brush, the viewer might perceive the image as two separate scenes. Yet, color ultimately unifies the composition: the chestnut tones of the woman's hair and sponge reappear in the copper pot and strands of false hair.

This orchestrated sense of a chance, overhead glimpse also intersected with broader anxieties about Degas's unconventional treatment of the nude. Degas rejected the idealized treatment of the nude favored by many of his contemporaries, who depicted mythological or literary figures in accordance with academic convention. Growe suggests that it was precisely this break from convention that led some critics to accuse Degas of voyeurism. Yet, he argues, what others interpreted as shamelessness or indiscretion was, for Degas, a commitment to unembellished truth. Degas conveyed this view to George Moore, remarking:

Hitherto the nude has always been represented in poses which presuppose an audience, but these women of mine are honest and simple folk, unconcerned by any other interests than those involved in their physical condition... It is as if you looked through a keyhole.

== Reception ==
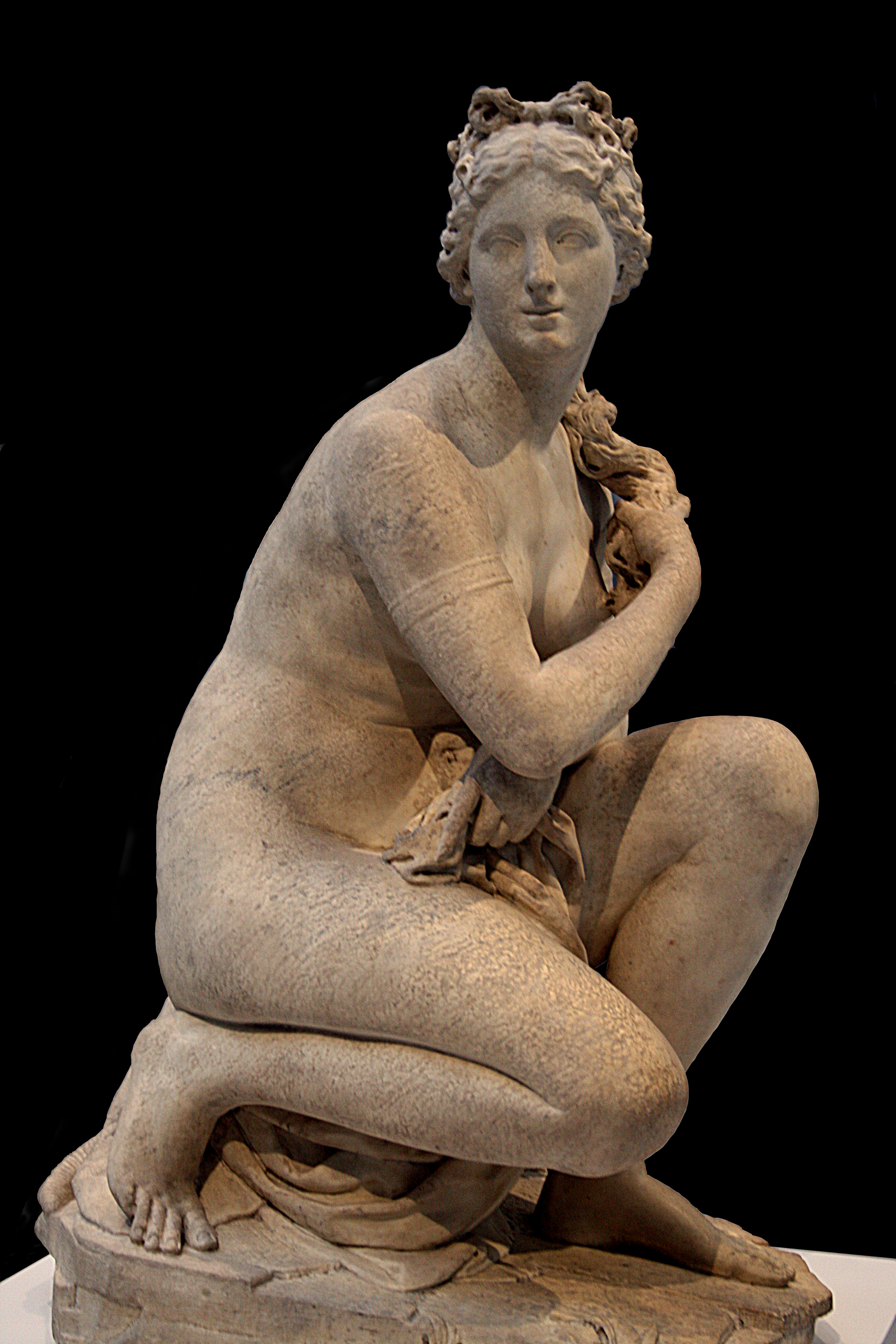
Crouching Venus (1686), a marble statue by Antoine Coysevox; H. 132 cm × W. 64 cm × D. 90 cm. Musée du Louvre, Paris (M 1826). Photographed in 2013 during its temporary exhibition in the Galerie du Temps at the Louvre-Lens.

At the time of the exhibition, most critics emphasized the realism of Degas's nude series. Félix Fénéon and Jules Desclozeaux exemplified this reading, with Desclozeaux writing of "the sharp gaze of a surgeon… a taste for reality". Some reviewers, however, turned to classical comparisons. Several, including George Moore, noted parallels between The Tub and the Crouching Venus in the Louvre, traditionally attributed to Doidalsas. The figure's crouching posture also recalls earlier compositions such as Semiramis Building Babylon and Nude Woman Crouching, study for Semiramis. Still others emphasized the pastel's beauty and technical refinement; Octave Mirbeau perceived in the work "the loveliness and power of a Gothic statue".

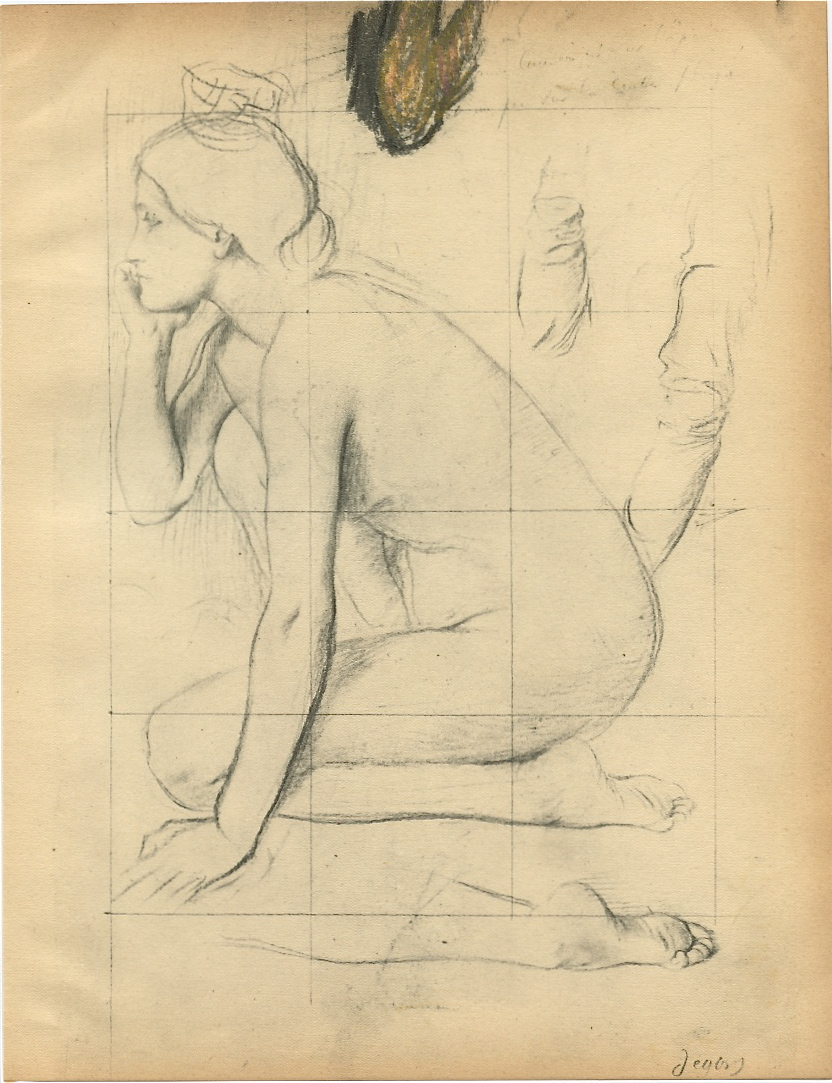
Nude Woman Crouching, study for Semiramis (c. 1860–62), a preparatory drawing for the later composition Semiramis Building Babylon; black chalk with pastel on wove paper, 34.1 × 22.4 cm. Cabinet des Dessins, Musée du Louvre, Paris (RF 15488).

In contrast to such praise, Joris-Karl Huysmans voiced the most vehement criticism of The Tub. His reaction reflects a strand of dissent within the broader reception, though his language was far more extreme than that of others who expressed reservations. Regarding the pastel, he wrote: "Here we have a redhead, plump and stuffed, curving her spine, breaking the bone of her sacrum on the stretched roundnesses of her backside". He further characterized Degas's broader series of nudes as assemblages of disordered limbs and inverted symmetries.

Yet, despite such intense criticism on the margins, the reception of The Tub was largely positive, and its long-term significance even more expansive. From about 1890 onward, Degas's nudes grew popular among collectors and exerted a marked influence on other artists: Paul Gauguin echoed their poses in his depictions of Tahitian women, Vincent van Gogh admired them openly, and Henri de Toulouse-Lautrec adapted their compositional strategies in his own work. The nude would continue to dominate Degas's creative output until 1908, when deteriorating eyesight forced him into inactivity.

== Provenance ==
The Tub was acquired immediately by Émile Boussod, ahead of its appearance in the spring exhibition. In 1895, the work was purchased by Count Isaac de Camondo for 14,000 francs and remained in his collection until his death. Camondo bequeathed the pastel to the Louvre in 1908; it formally entered the museum's collection in 1911 and was first exhibited there in 1914. After the Musée d'Orsay was established in 1986, the work was transferred there.

== See also ==
- Woman in a Tub, another pastel of the same subject
