= Alphonse Mucha =

Czech painter, illustrator and graphic artist (1860–1939)

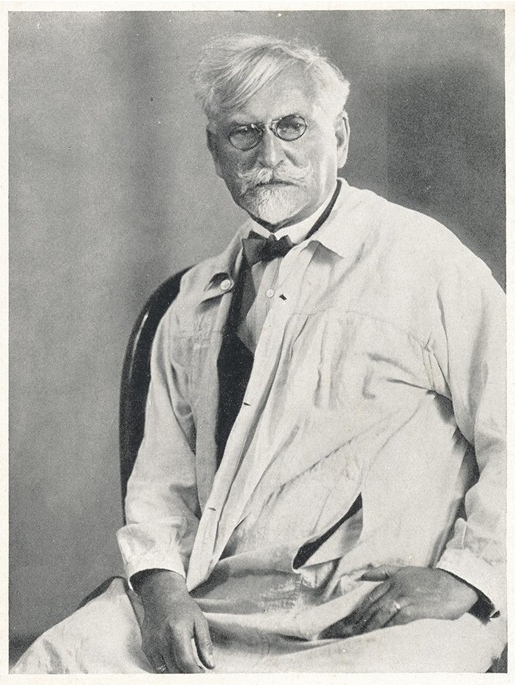
- Mucha in 1928
- Born: Alfons Maria Mucha; 24 July 1860; Ivančice, Moravia, Austrian Empire
- Died: 14 July 1939 (aged 78); Prague, Protectorate of Bohemia and Moravia
- Education: Munich Academy of Fine Arts; Académie Julian; Académie Colarossi
- Known for: Painting, illustration, decorative art, architecture
- Notable work: The Slav Epic; The Seasons
- Movement: Art Nouveau
- Awards: Legion of Honour (France), Knight of the Order of Franz Joseph (Austria)

Alfons Maria Mucha (Czech: [ˈalfons ˈmuxa]; 24 July 1860 – 14 July 1939), known in English as Alphonse Mucha, was a Czech painter, illustrator, and graphic artist. Living in Paris during the Art Nouveau period, he was widely known for his distinctly stylised and decorative theatrical posters, particularly those of Sarah Bernhardt. He produced illustrations, advertisements, decorative panels, as well as designs, which became among the best-known images of the period, earning him the sobriquet "Master of Art Nouveau".

In the second part of his career, at the age of 57, he returned to his homeland and devoted himself to a series of twenty monumental symbolist canvases known as The Slav Epic, depicting the history of all the Slavic peoples of the world, which he painted between 1912 and 1926. In 1928, on the 10th anniversary of the independence of Czechoslovakia, he presented the series to the Czech nation. He considered it his most important work.

== Early life ==
Mucha was born on 24 July 1860 in the small town of Ivančice in southern Moravia, then a province of the Austrian Empire (present-day a region of the Czech Republic). His family had a very modest income; his father Ondřej was a court usher, and his mother Amálie was a miller's daughter. Alphonse was the eldest of six children, all with names starting with "A".

Mucha showed an early talent for drawing; a local merchant impressed by his work gave him a gift of paper, at the time a luxury item. In the preschool period, he drew exclusively with his left hand. He had a talent for music: he was an alto singer and violin player. After completing Volksschule, he wanted to continue with his studies, but his family was not able to fund them, as they were already funding the studies of his three step-siblings.

His music teacher sent him to Pavel Křížkovský, choirmaster of St Thomas's Abbey in Brno, to be admitted to the choir and to have his studies funded by the monastery. Křížovský was impressed by his talent, but he was not able to admit and fund him, as he had just admitted another talented young musician, Leoš Janáček.

Křížovský sent him to a choirmaster of the Cathedral of St. Peter and Paul, who admitted him as a chorister and funded his studies at the gymnasium in Brno, where he received his secondary school education. After his voice broke, he gave up his chorister position, but played as a violinist during masses.

He became devoutly religious, and wrote later, "For me, the notions of painting, going to church, and music are so closely knit that often I cannot decide whether I like church for its music, or music for its place in the mystery which it accompanies." He grew up in an environment of intense Czech nationalism in all the arts, from music to literature and painting. He designed flyers and posters for patriotic rallies.

His singing abilities allowed him to continue his musical education at the Gymnázium Brno in the Moravian capital of Brno, but his true ambition was to become an artist. He found some employment designing theatrical scenery and other decorations. In 1878 he applied to the Academy of Fine Arts in Prague, but was rejected and advised to "find a different career". In 1880, at the age of 19, he travelled to Vienna, the political and cultural capital of the Empire, and found employment as an apprentice scenery painter for a company that made sets for Vienna theatres. While in Vienna, he discovered the museums, churches, palaces and especially theatres, for which he received free tickets from his employer. He also discovered Hans Makart, a very prominent academic painter, who created murals for many of the palaces and government buildings in Vienna, and was a master of portraits and historical paintings in grand format. His style turned Mucha in that artistic direction and influenced his later work. He began experimenting with photography, which became an important tool in his later work.

To his misfortune, a terrible fire in 1881 destroyed the Ringtheater, the major client of his firm. Later in 1881, almost without funds, he took a train as far north as his money would take him. He arrived in Mikulov in southern Moravia, and began making portraits, decorative art and lettering for tombstones. His work was appreciated, and he was commissioned by Count Eduard Khuen Belasi, a local landlord and nobleman, to paint a series of murals for his residence at Emmahof Castle, and then at his ancestral home in the Tyrol, Gandegg Castle. The paintings at Emmahof were destroyed by fire in 1948, but his early versions in small format exist. (Note: On display at the museum in Brno.) He showed his skill at mythological themes, the female form, and lush vegetal decoration. Belasi, who was also an amateur painter, took Mucha on expeditions to see art in Venice, Florence, and Milan, and introduced him to many artists, including the famous Bavarian romantic painter, Wilhelm Kray, who lived in Munich.

=== Munich ===
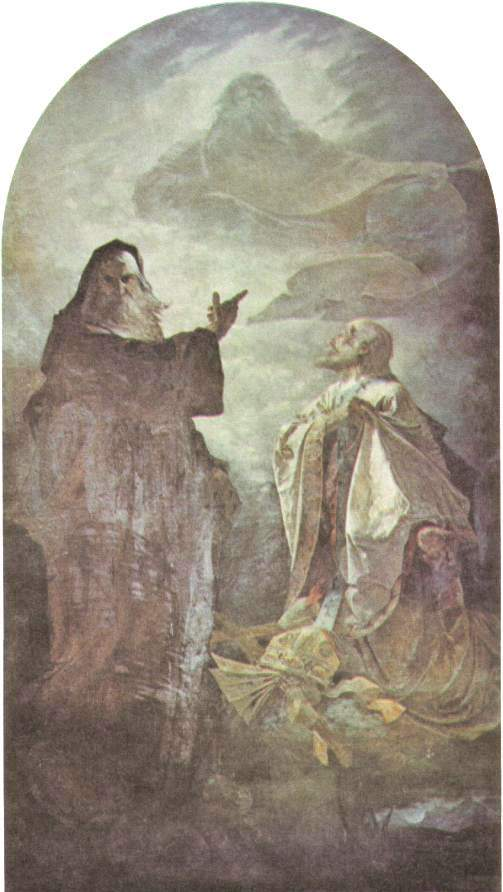
Portrait of Saints Cyril and Methodius for the Roman Catholic church in Pisek (1887)

Count Belasi decided to bring Mucha to Munich for formal training, and paid his tuition fees and living expenses at the Munich Academy of Fine Arts. He moved there in September 1885. It is not clear how Mucha actually studied at the Munich Academy; there is no record of his being enrolled as a student there. However, he did become friends with a number of notable Slavic artists there, including the Czechs Karel Vítězslav Mašek and Ludek Marold and the Russian Leonid Pasternak, father of the famous poet and novelist Boris Pasternak.

He founded a Czech students' club, and contributed political illustrations to nationalist publications in Prague. In 1886, he received a notable commission for a painting of the Czech patron saints Cyril and Methodius from a group of Czech emigrants, including some of his relatives, who had founded a Roman Catholic church in the town of Pisek in the U.S. He was very happy with the artistic environment of Munich: he wrote to friends, "Here I am in my new element, painting. I cross all sorts of currents, but without effort, and even with joy. Here, for the first time, I can find the objectives to reach which used to seem inaccessible." However, he found he could not remain forever in Munich; the Bavarian authorities imposed increasing restrictions upon foreign students and residents. Count Belasi suggested that he travel either to Rome or to Paris. With Belasi's financial support, he decided in 1887 to move to Paris.

== Paris ==
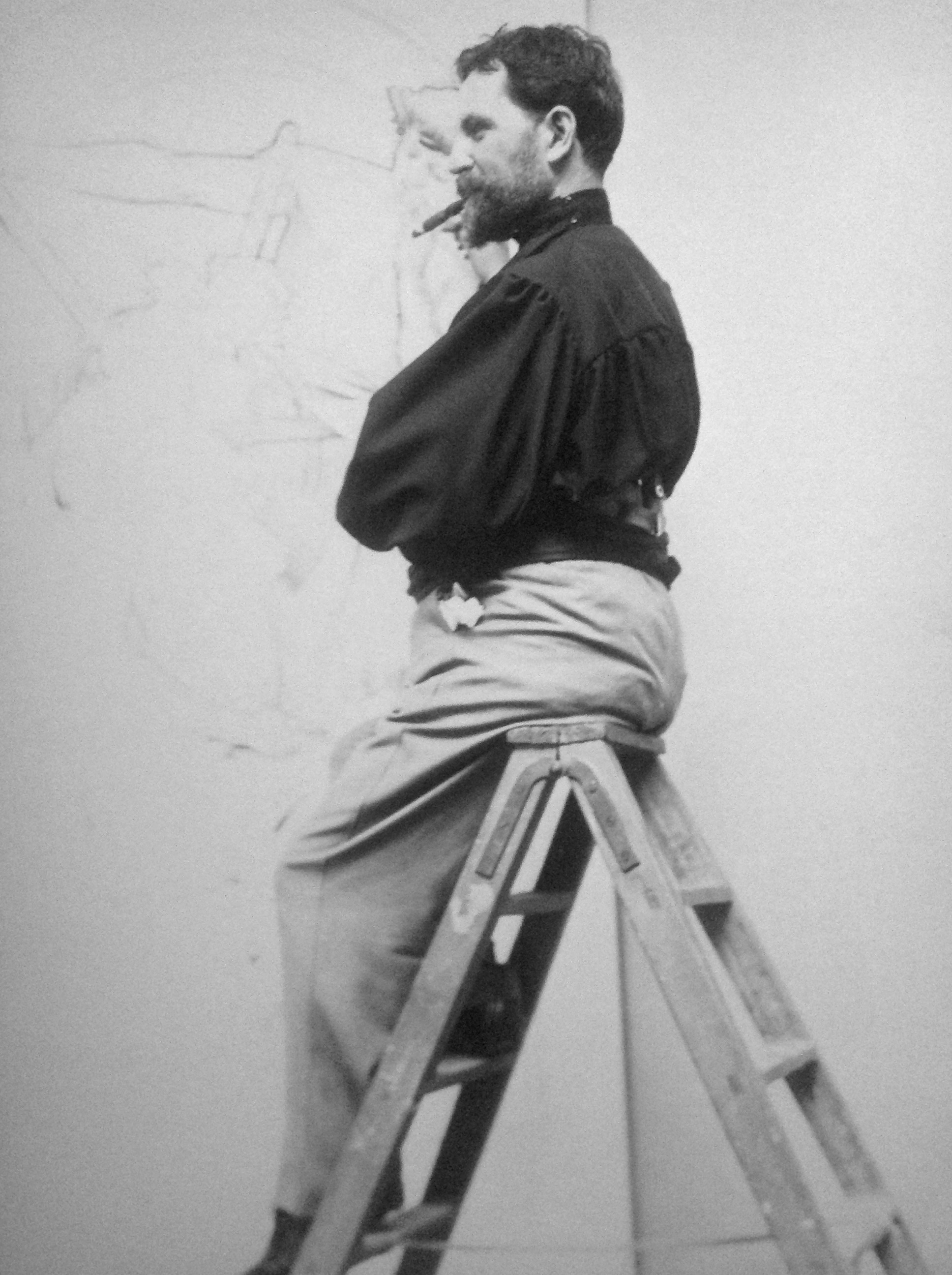
Mucha working on a poster for publishing house Cassan (1896)

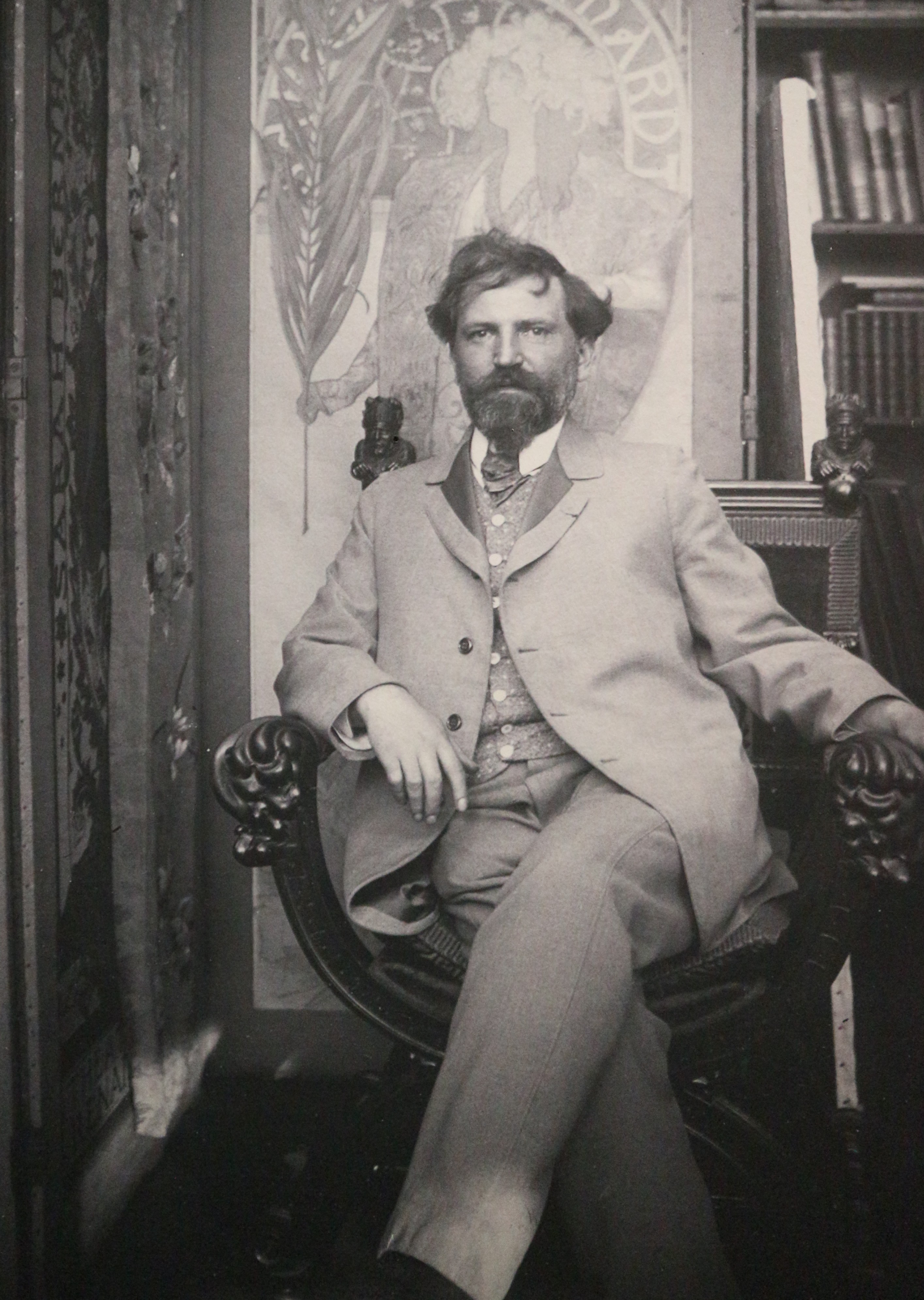
Self-portrait of in front of a poster intended for Sarah Bernhardt, in his studio located on Rue du Val-de-Grâce in Paris (c. 1899)

Mucha moved to Paris in 1888 where he enrolled in the Académie Julian and the following year, 1889, Académie Colarossi. The two schools taught a wide variety of different styles. His first professors at the Académie Julian were Jules Lefebvre who specialised in female nudes and allegorical paintings, and Jean-Paul Laurens, whose specialties were historical and religious paintings in a realistic and dramatic style. At the end of 1889, as he approached the age of thirty, his patron, Count Belasi, decided that Mucha had received enough education and ended his subsidies.

When he arrived in Paris, Mucha found shelter with the help of the large Slavic community. He lived in a boarding house called the Crémerie at 13 rue de la Grande Chaumière, whose owner, Charlotte Caron, was famous for sheltering struggling artists; when needed she accepted paintings or drawings in place of rent. Mucha decided to follow the path of another Czech painter he knew from Munich, Ludek Marold, who had made a successful career as an illustrator for magazines. In 1890 and 1891, he began providing illustrations for the weekly magazine La Vie populaire, which published novels in weekly segments. His illustration for a novel by Guy de Maupassant, called The Useless Beauty, was on the cover of 22 May 1890 edition. He also made illustrations for Le Petit Français illustré, which published stories for young people in both magazine and book form. For this magazine he provided dramatic scenes of battles and other historic events, including a cover illustration of a scene from the Franco-Prussian War which was on the cover of the 23 January 1892 edition.

His illustrations began to give him a regular income. He was able to buy a harmonium to continue his musical interests, and his first camera, which used glass-plate negatives. He took pictures of himself and his friends, and also regularly used it to compose his drawings. He became friends with Paul Gauguin, and shared a studio with him for a time when Gauguin returned from Tahiti in the summer of 1893. In late autumn 1894, he also became friends with the playwright August Strindberg, with whom he had common interests in philosophy and mysticism.

His magazine illustrations led to book illustration; he was commissioned to provide illustrations for Scenes and Episodes of German History by the historian Charles Seignobos. Four of his illustrations, including one depicting the death of Frederic Barbarossa, were chosen for display at the 1894 Paris Salon of Artists. He received a medal of honour, his first official recognition.

Mucha added another important client in the early 1890s; the Central Library of Fine Arts, which specialised in the publication of books about art, architecture, and the decorative arts. It later launched a new magazine in 1897 called Art et Decoration, which played an early and important role in publicising the Art Nouveau style. Mucha continued to publish illustrations for his other clients, including for a children's book of poetry by Eugène Manuel and for a magazine of the theatre arts called Le Costume au théâtre.

== Sarah Bernhardt's theatre ==
Sarah Bernhardt in her Gismonda costume, photographed by Théobald Chartran (1896)

At the end of 1894, Mucha's career took a dramatic and unexpected turn when he began to work for the French stage actress Sarah Bernhardt. As Mucha later described it, on 26 December, Bernhardt made a telephone call to Maurice de Brunhoff, the manager of the publishing firm Lemercier, which printed her theatrical posters, ordering a new poster for the continuation of the play Gismonda. The play, by Victorien Sardou, had already opened with great success on 31 October 1894 at the Théâtre de la Renaissance on the Boulevard Saint-Martin. Bernhardt decided to have a poster made to advertise the prolongation of the theatrical run after the Christmas break, insisting it be ready by 1 January 1895. Because of the holidays, none of the regular Lemercier artists was available.

When Bernhardt called, Mucha happened to be at the publishing house correcting proofs. He already had experience painting Bernhardt; he had made a series of illustrations of her performing in Cleopatra for Le Costume au Théâtre in 1890. When Gismonda opened in October 1894, Mucha had been commissioned by the magazine Le Gaulois to make a series of illustrations of Bernhardt in the role for a special Christmas supplement, which was published at Christmas 1894, for the high price of fifty centimes per copy.

Brunhoff asked Mucha to quickly design the new poster for Bernhardt. The poster was more than life-size; a little more than two meters high, with Bernhardt in the costume of a Byzantine noblewoman, dressed in an orchid headdress and a floral stole, and holding a palm branch in the Easter procession near the end of the play. One of the innovative features of the poster was the ornate rainbow-shaped arch behind the head, almost like a halo, which focused attention on her face; this feature appeared in all of Mucha's future theatre posters. Probably because of a shortage of time, some areas of the background were left blank, without his usual decoration. The only background decoration was the Byzantine mosaic tiles behind her head. The poster featured extremely fine draftsmanship and delicate pastel colours, unlike the typical brightly coloured posters of the time. The top of the poster, with the title, was richly composed and ornamented, and balanced the bottom, where the essential information was given in the shortest possible form: just the name of the theatre.

The poster appeared on the streets of Paris on 1 January 1895 and caused an immediate sensation. Bernhardt was pleased by the reaction; she ordered four thousand copies of the poster in 1895 and 1896, and gave Mucha a six-year contract to produce more. With his posters all over the city, Mucha found himself quite suddenly famous.

Following Gismonda, Bernhardt switched to a different printer, F. Champenois, who, like Mucha, was put under contract to work for Bernhardt for six years. Champenois had a large printing house on Boulevard Saint Michel that employed three hundred workers, with twenty steam presses. He gave Mucha a generous monthly salary in exchange for the rights to publish all his works. With his increased income, Mucha was able to move to a three-bedroom apartment with a large studio inside a large historic house at 6 Rue du Val-de-Grâce originally built by François Mansart.

Mucha designed posters for each successive Bernhardt play, beginning with a reprise of one of her early great successes, La Dame aux Camelias (September 1896), followed by Lorenzaccio (1896); Medea (1898); La Tosca (1898), and Hamlet (1899). He sometimes worked from photographs of Bernhardt, as he did for La Tosca. In addition to posters, he designed theatrical programs, sets, costumes, and jewellery for Bernhardt. The enterprising Bernhardt set aside a certain number of printed posters of each play to sell to collectors.

Posters for Bernhardt's theatre plays

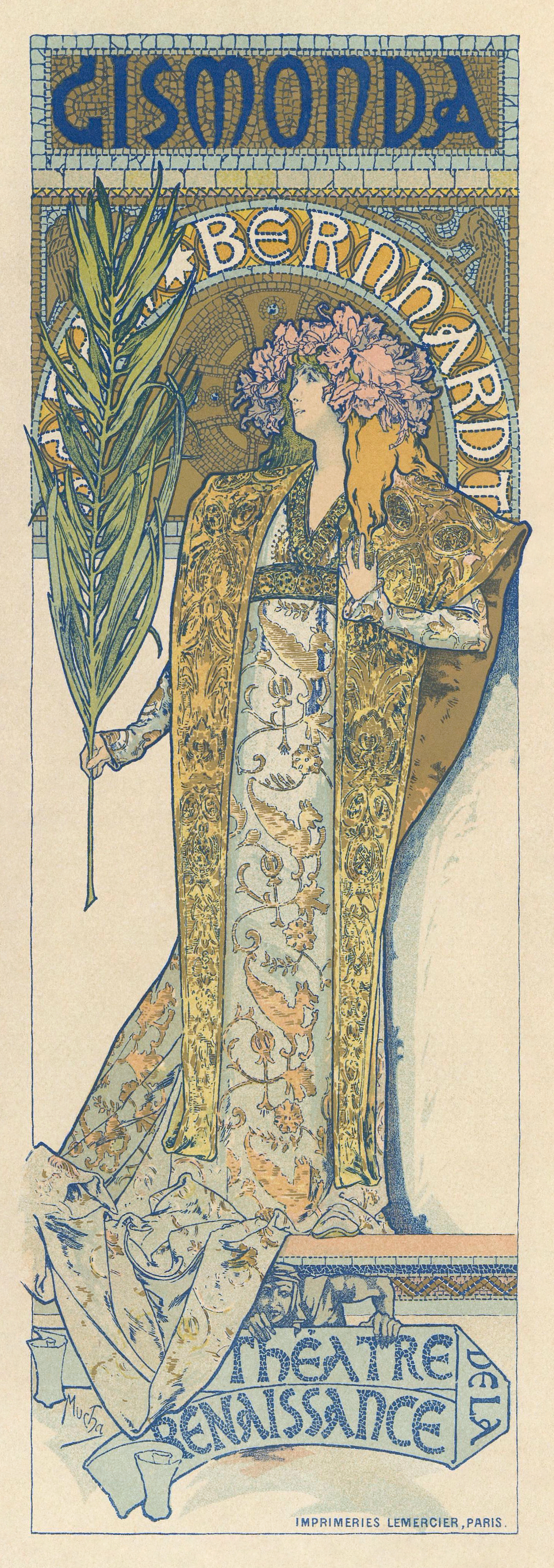
Gismonda (1894)

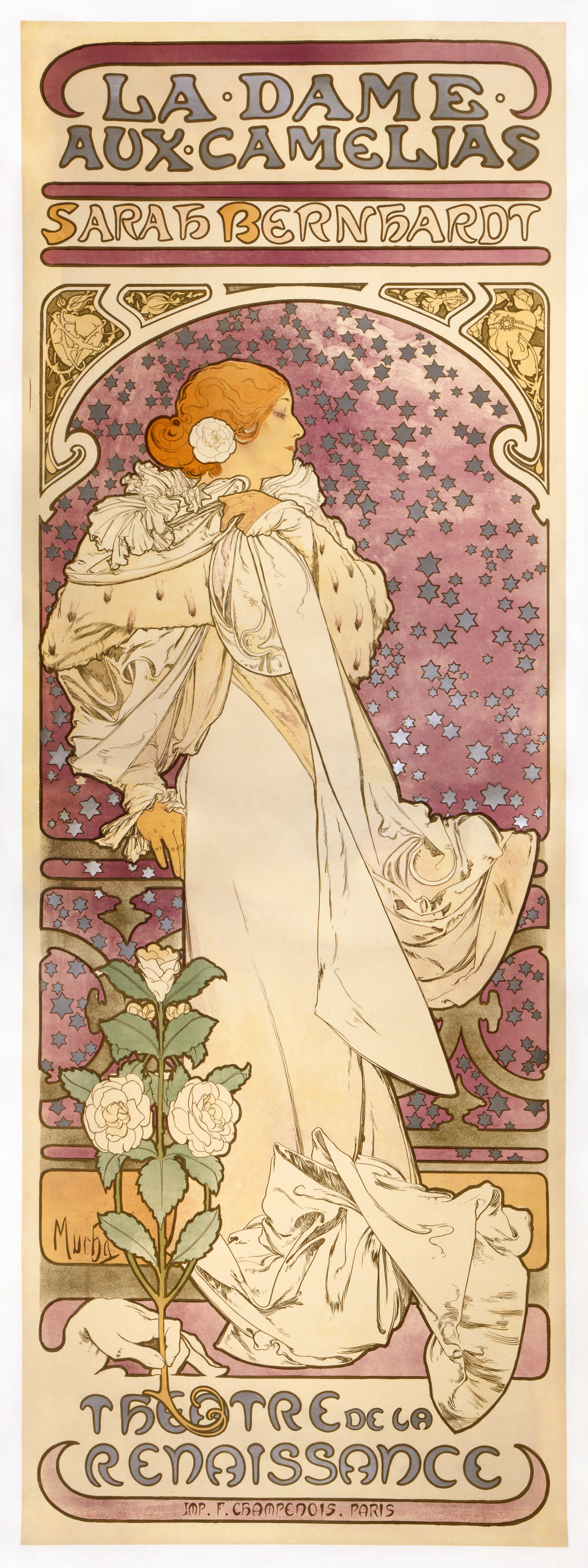
La Dame aux Camélias (1896)

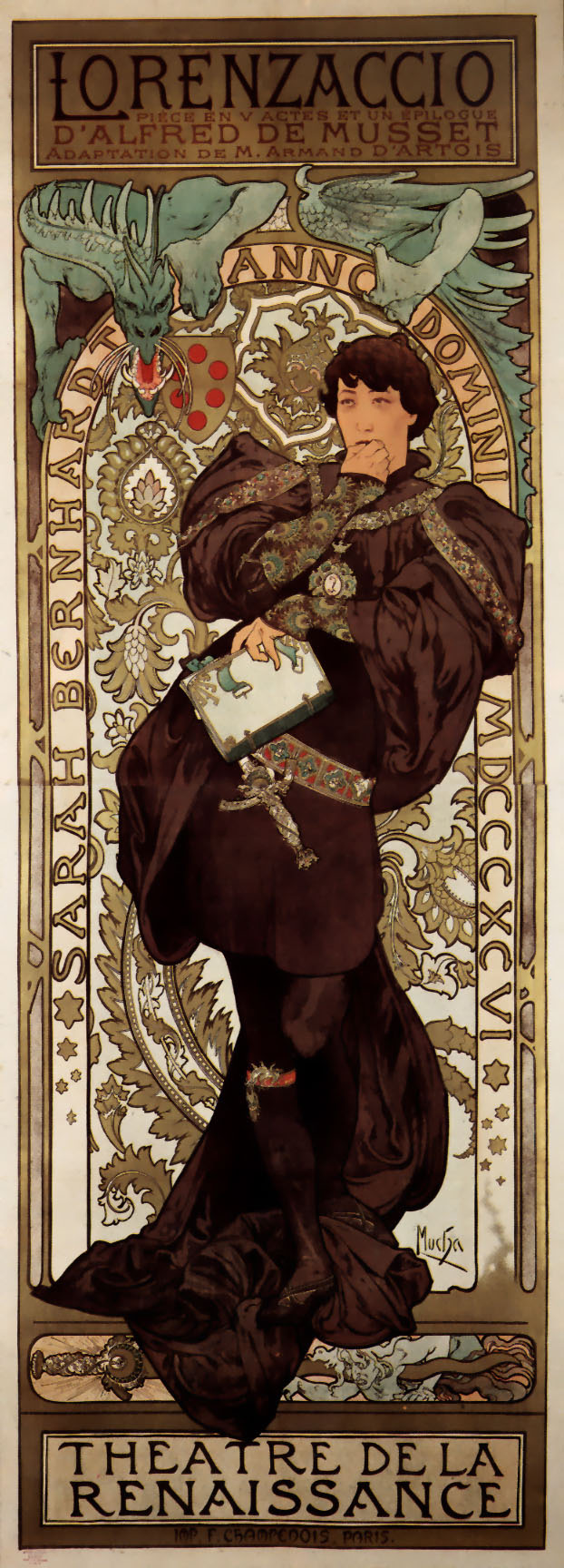
Lorenzaccio (1896)

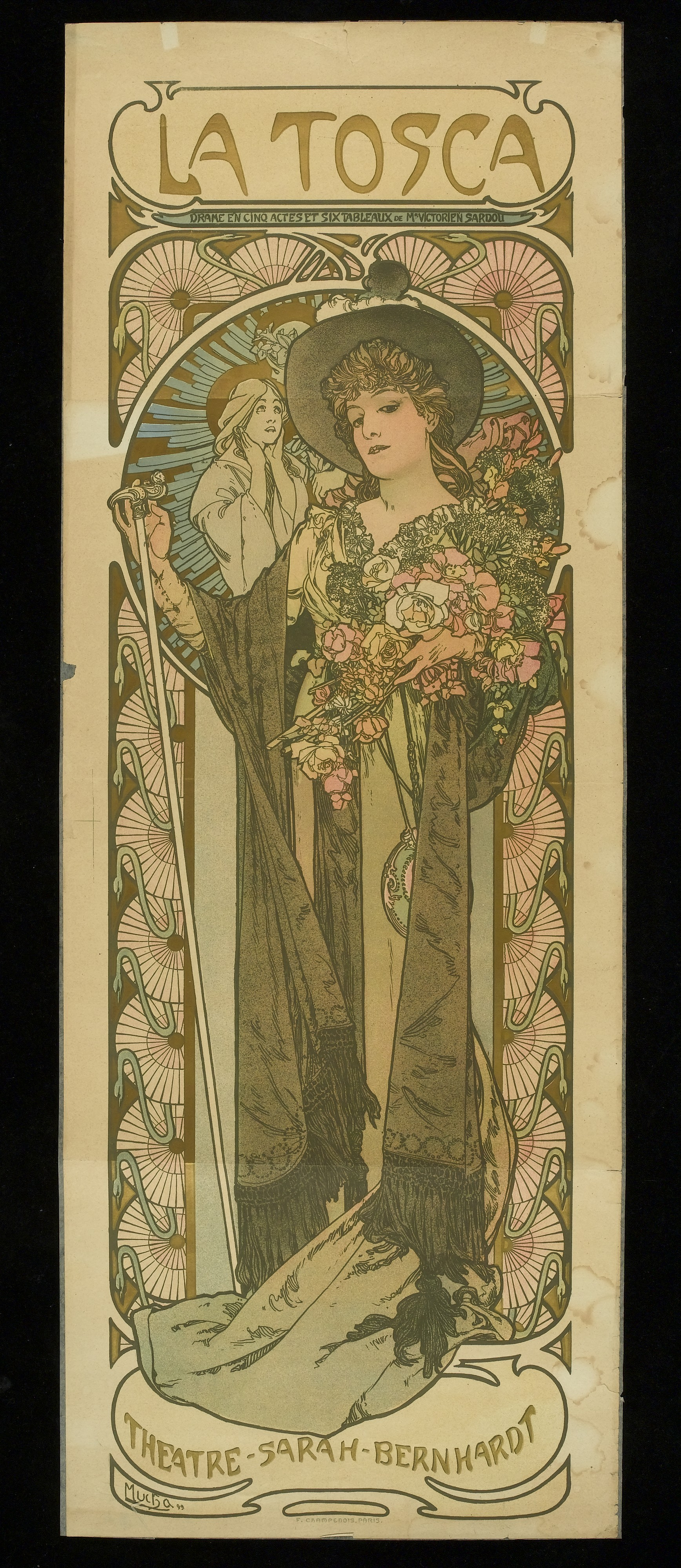
La Tosca (1898)

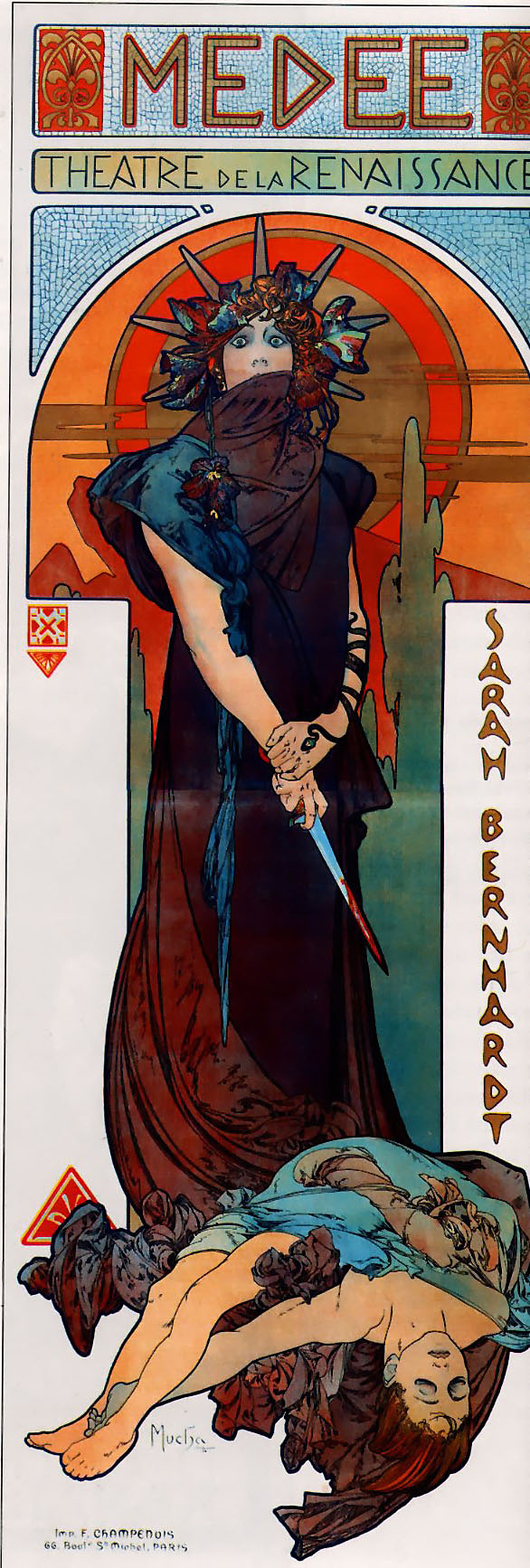
Medea (1898)

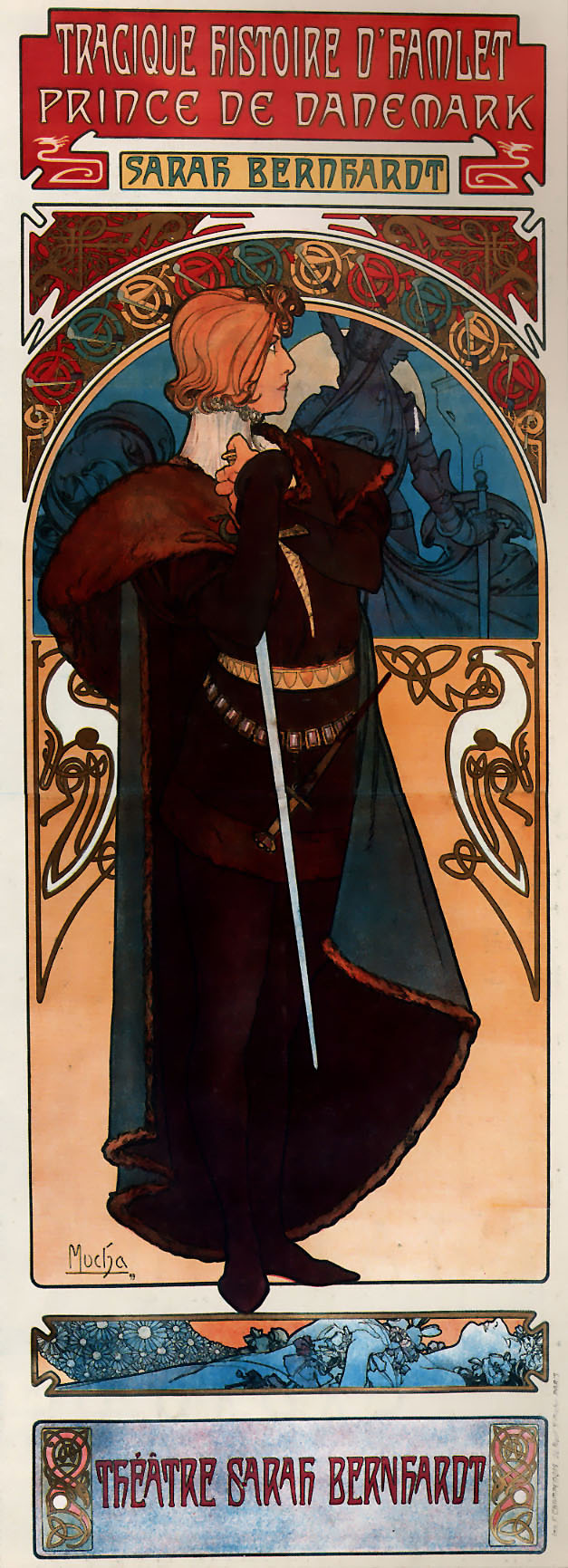
Hamlet (1899)

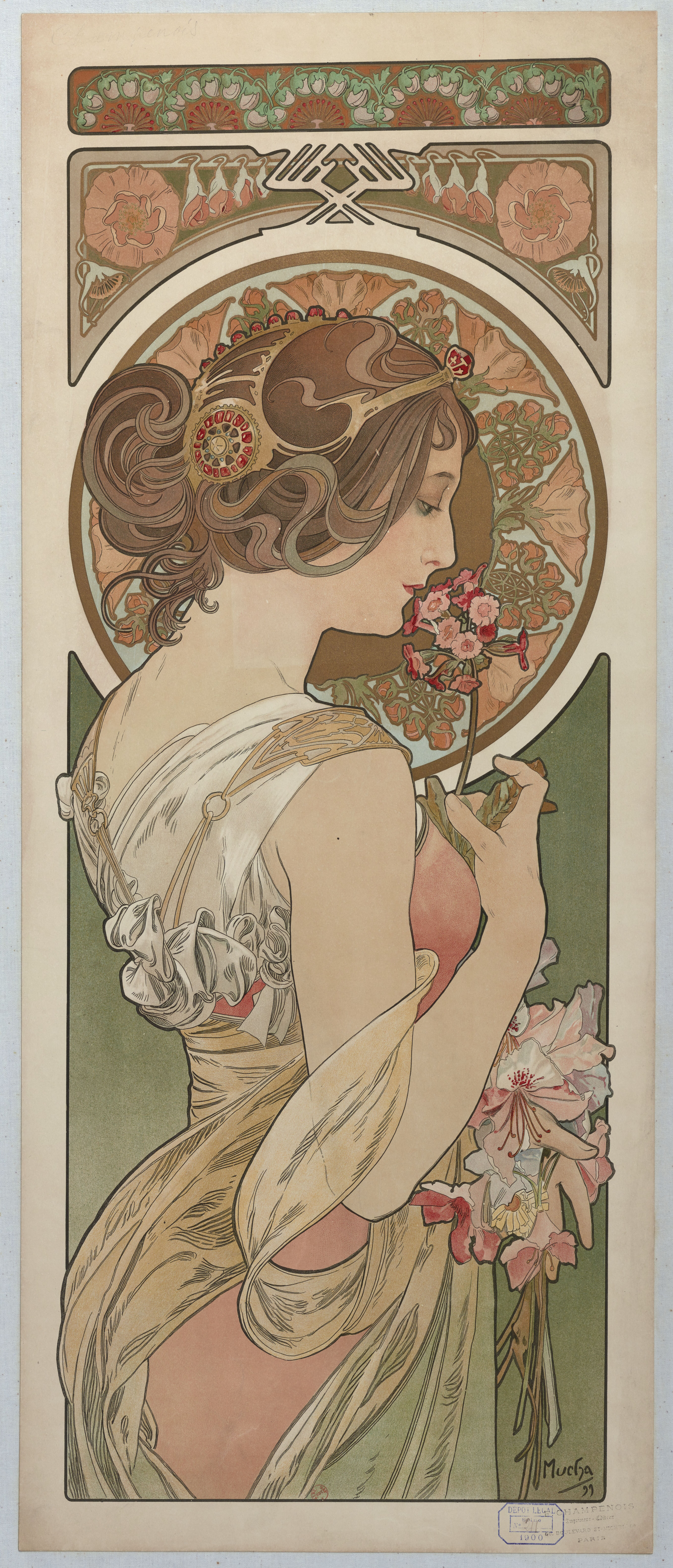
La Primevère (1899)

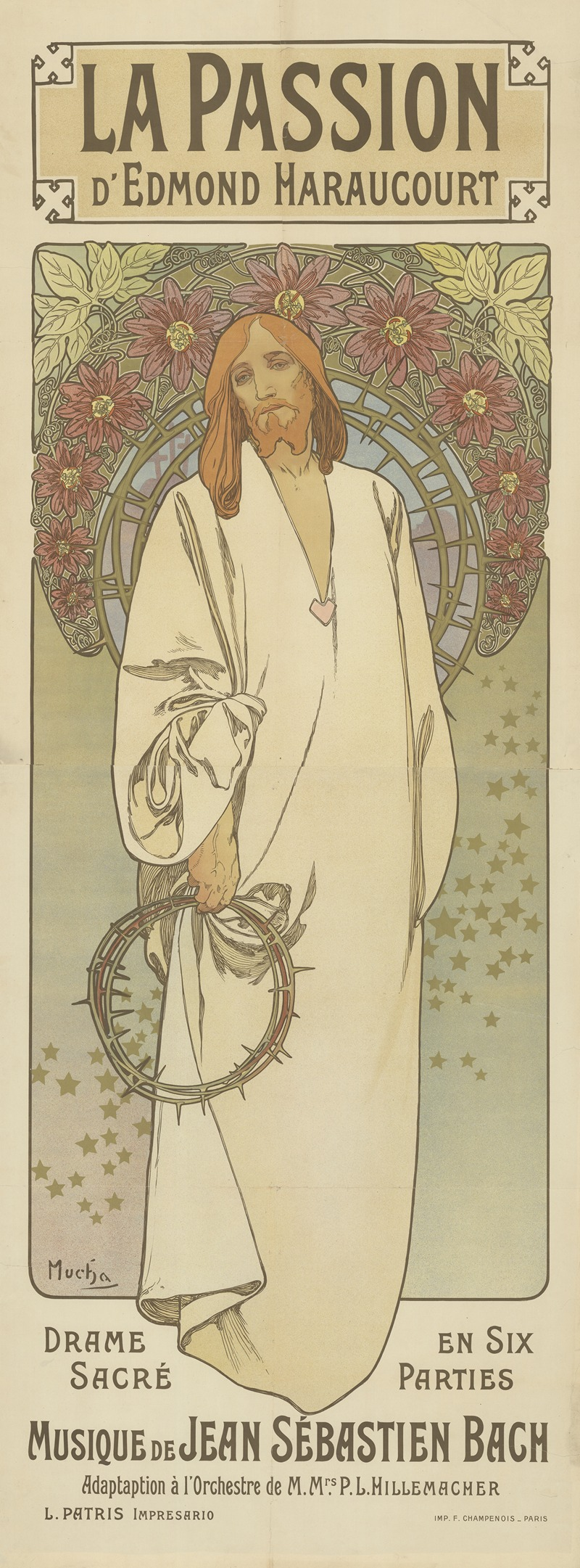
La Passion (1904)

== Commercial art and posters ==
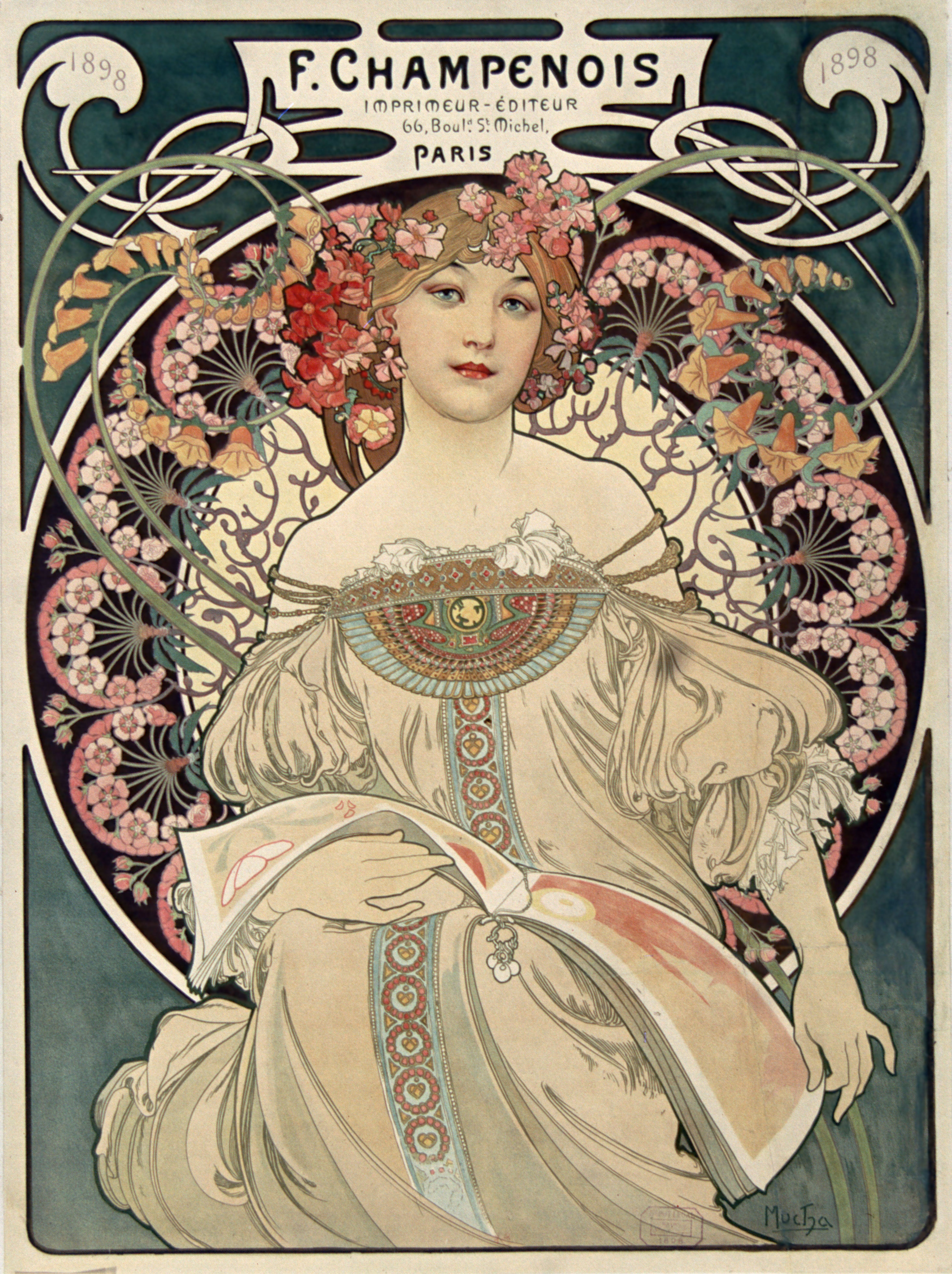
Rêverie, poster for the publishing house Champenois (1897)

The success of the Bernhardt posters brought Mucha commissions for advertising posters. He designed posters for JOB cigarette papers, Ruinart Champagne, Lefèvre-Utile biscuits, Nestlé baby food, Idéal Chocolate, the Beers of the Meuse, Moët & Chandon champagne, La Trappistine brandy, and Waverly and Perfect bicycles. His posters focused almost entirely on beautiful women in lavish settings with their hair usually curling in arabesque forms and filling the frame. His poster for the railway line between Paris and Monaco-Monte Carlo (1897) did not show a train or any identifiable scene of Monaco or Monte Carlo; it showed a beautiful young woman in a kind of reverie, surrounded by swirling floral images, which suggested the turning wheels of a train.

With Champenois, he also created a new kind of product, a decorative panel, a poster without text, purely for decoration. They were published in large print runs for a modest price. The first series was The Seasons (1896), depicting four different women in extremely decorative floral settings representing the seasons of the year. In 1897 he produced an individual decorative panel of a young woman in a floral setting, called Rêverie, for Champenois. He also designed a calendar with a woman's head surrounded by the signs of the zodiac. The rights were resold to Léon Deschamps, the editor of the arts review La Plume, who brought it out with great success in 1897. The Seasons (1896) series was followed by The Flowers (1898), The Arts (1898), The Times of Day (1899), Precious Stones (1900), and The Moon and the Stars (1902). Between 1896 and 1904 Mucha created over one hundred poster designs for Champenois. These were sold in various formats, ranging from expensive versions printed on Japanese paper or vellum, to less expensive versions which combined multiple images, to calendars and postcards.

The fame of his posters led to success in the art world; he was invited by Deschamps to show his work in the Salon des Cent exhibition in 1896, and then, in 1897, to have a major retrospective in the same gallery showing 448 works. The magazine La Plume made a special edition devoted to his work, and his exhibition travelled to Vienna, Prague, Munich, Brussels, London, and New York, giving him an international reputation.

Commercial art posters

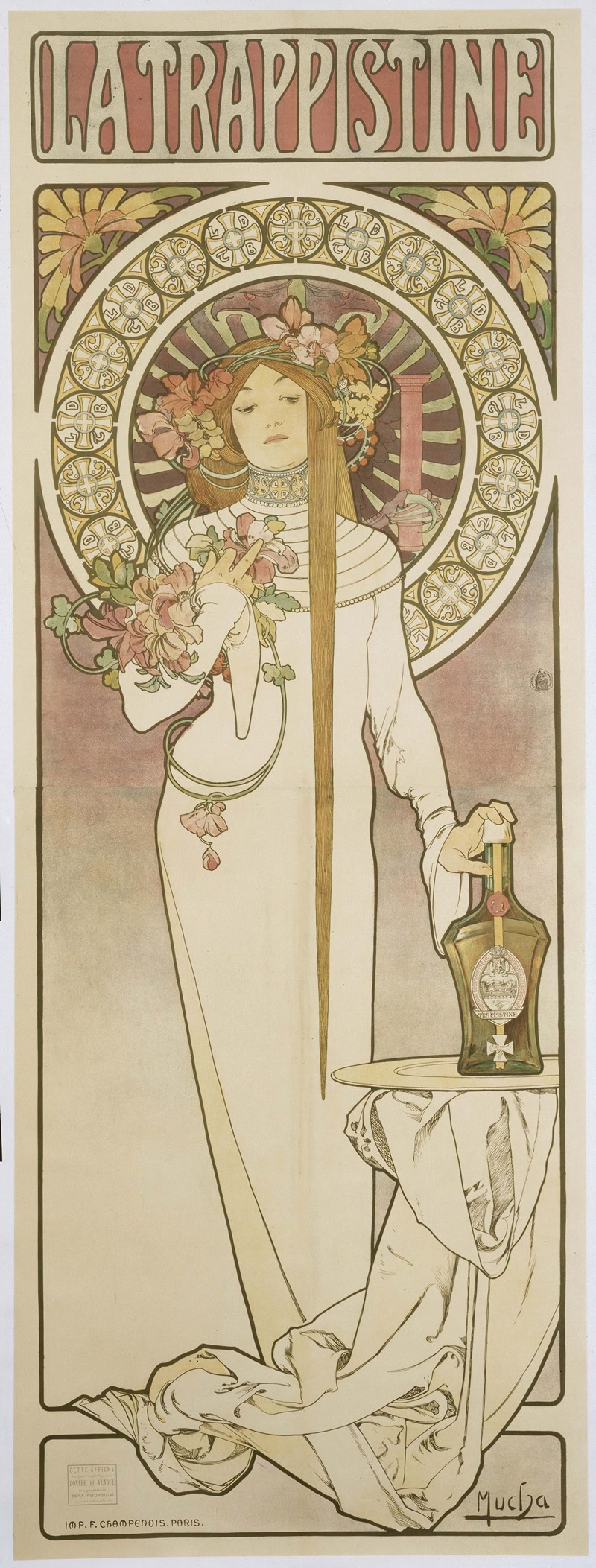
La Trappistine (1896)

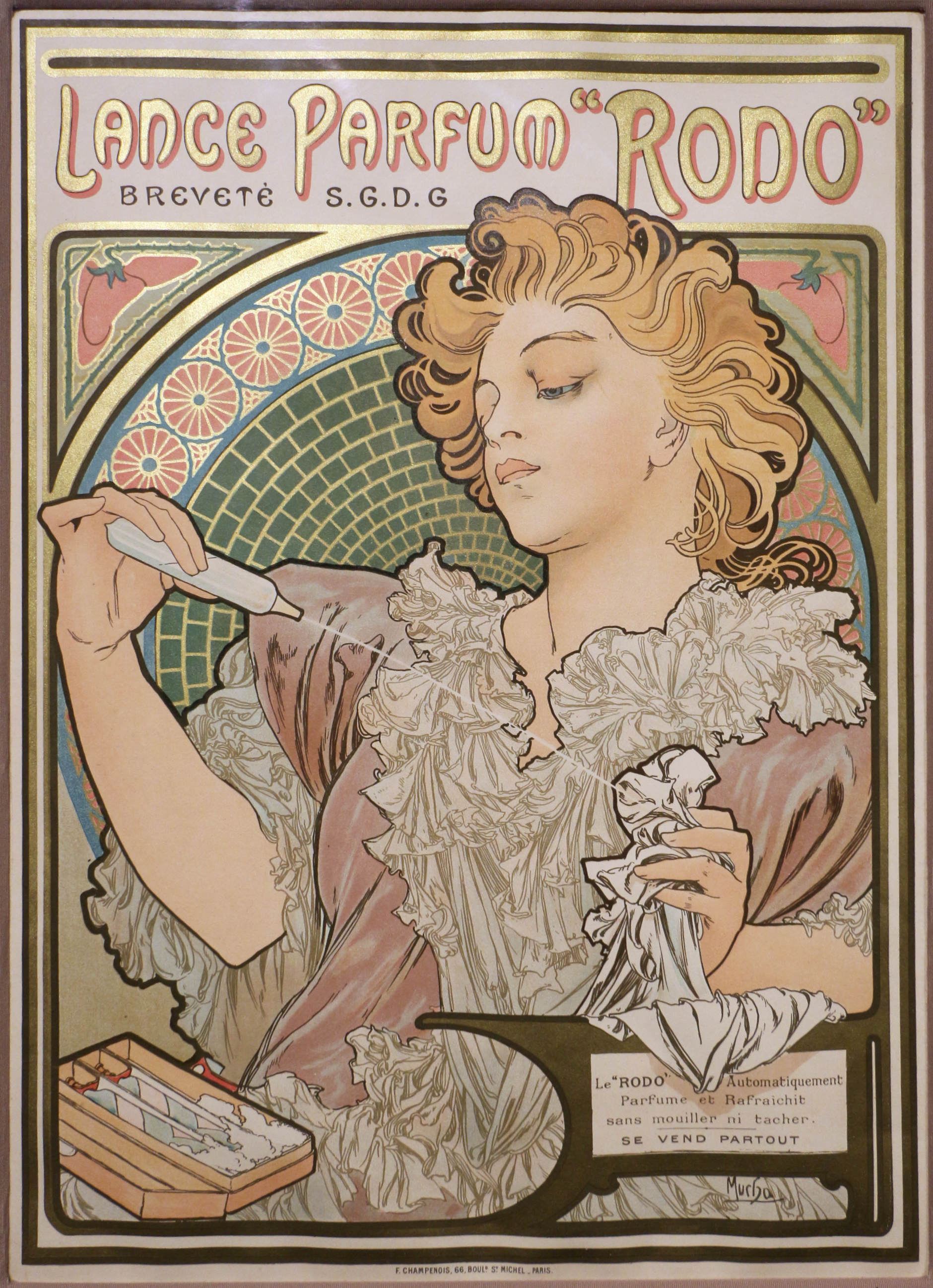
Lance parfum 'Rodo' (1896)

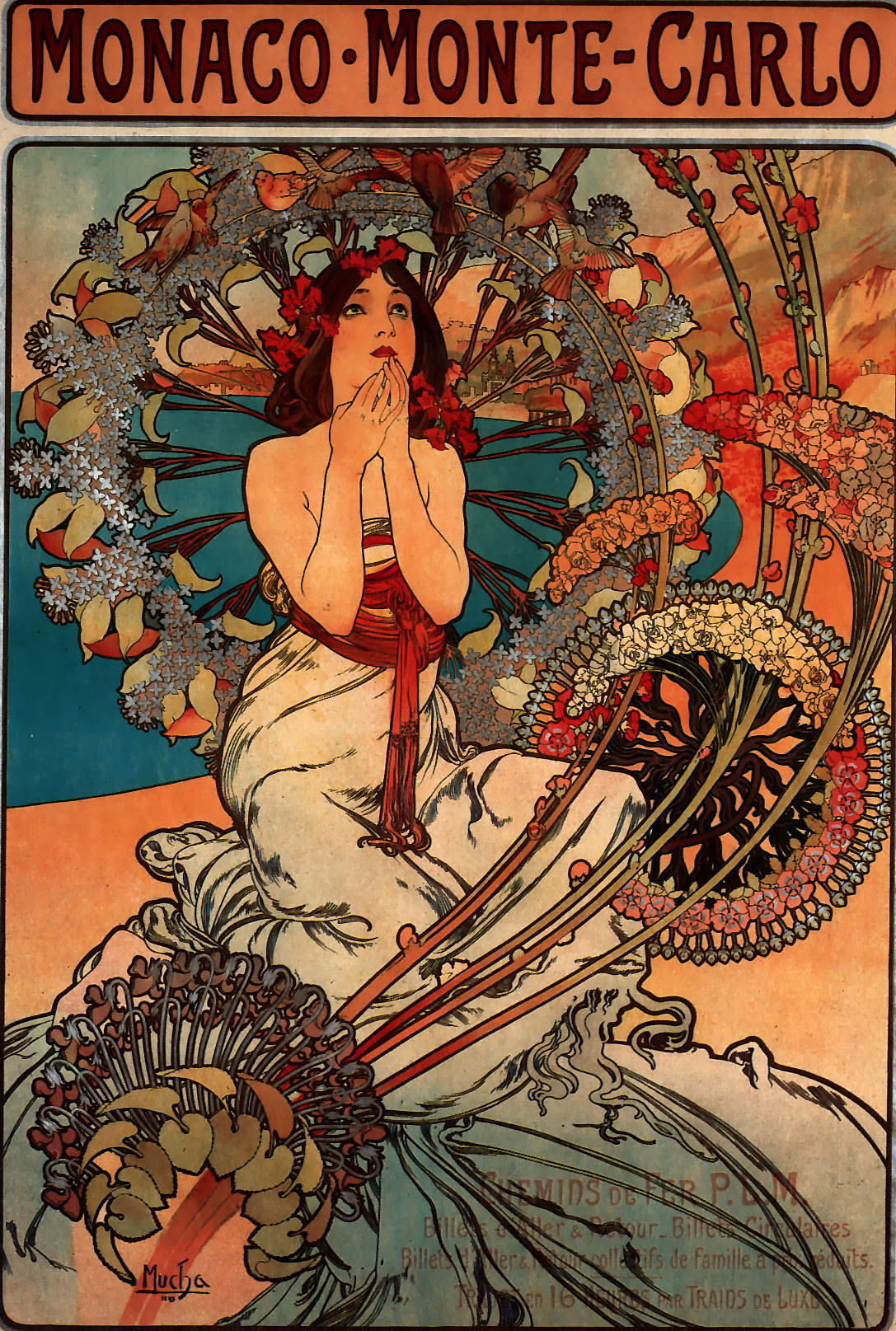
Railway Paris to Monaco and Monte-Carlo (1897)

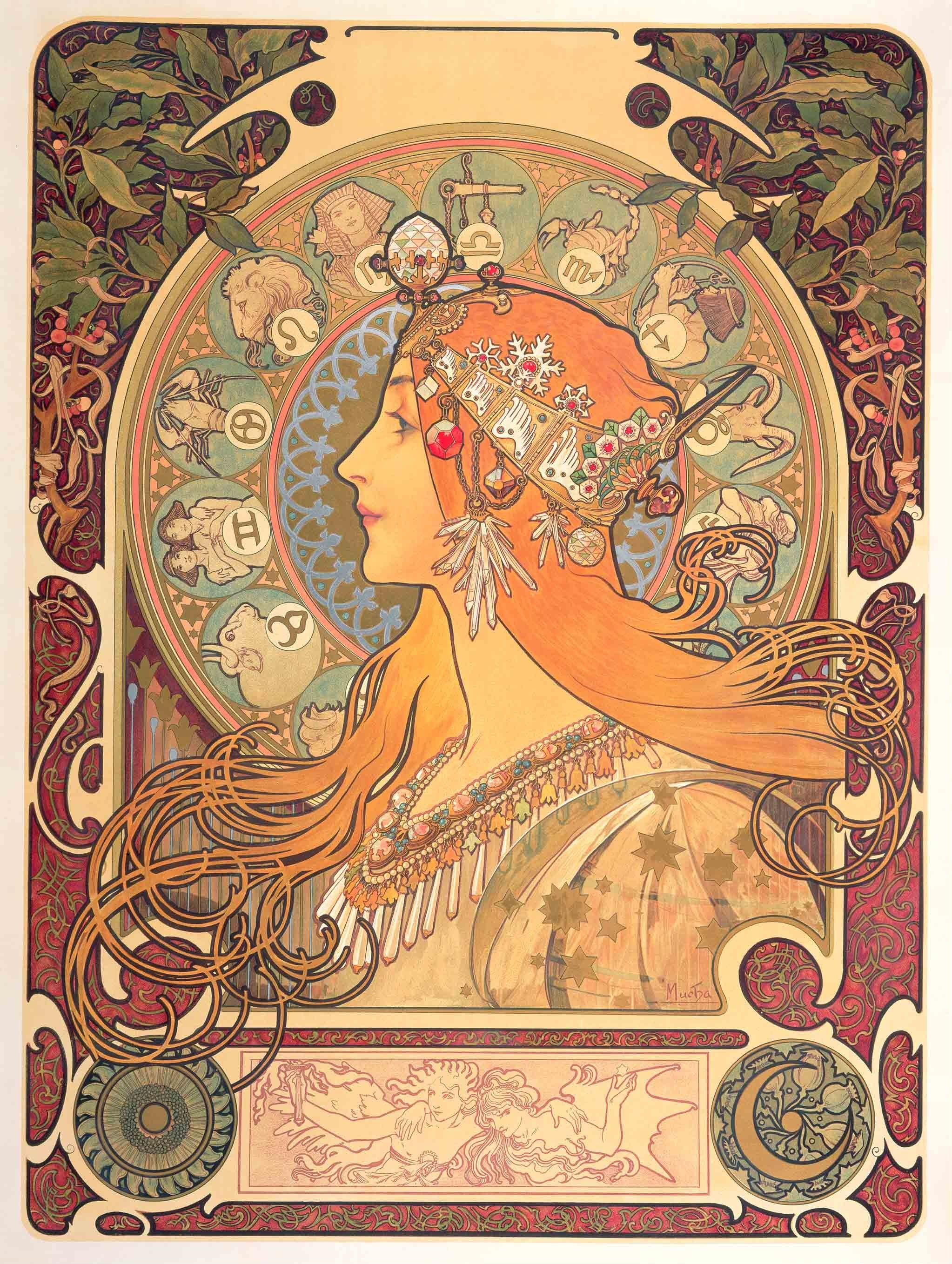
Zodiac calendar for La Plume (1897)

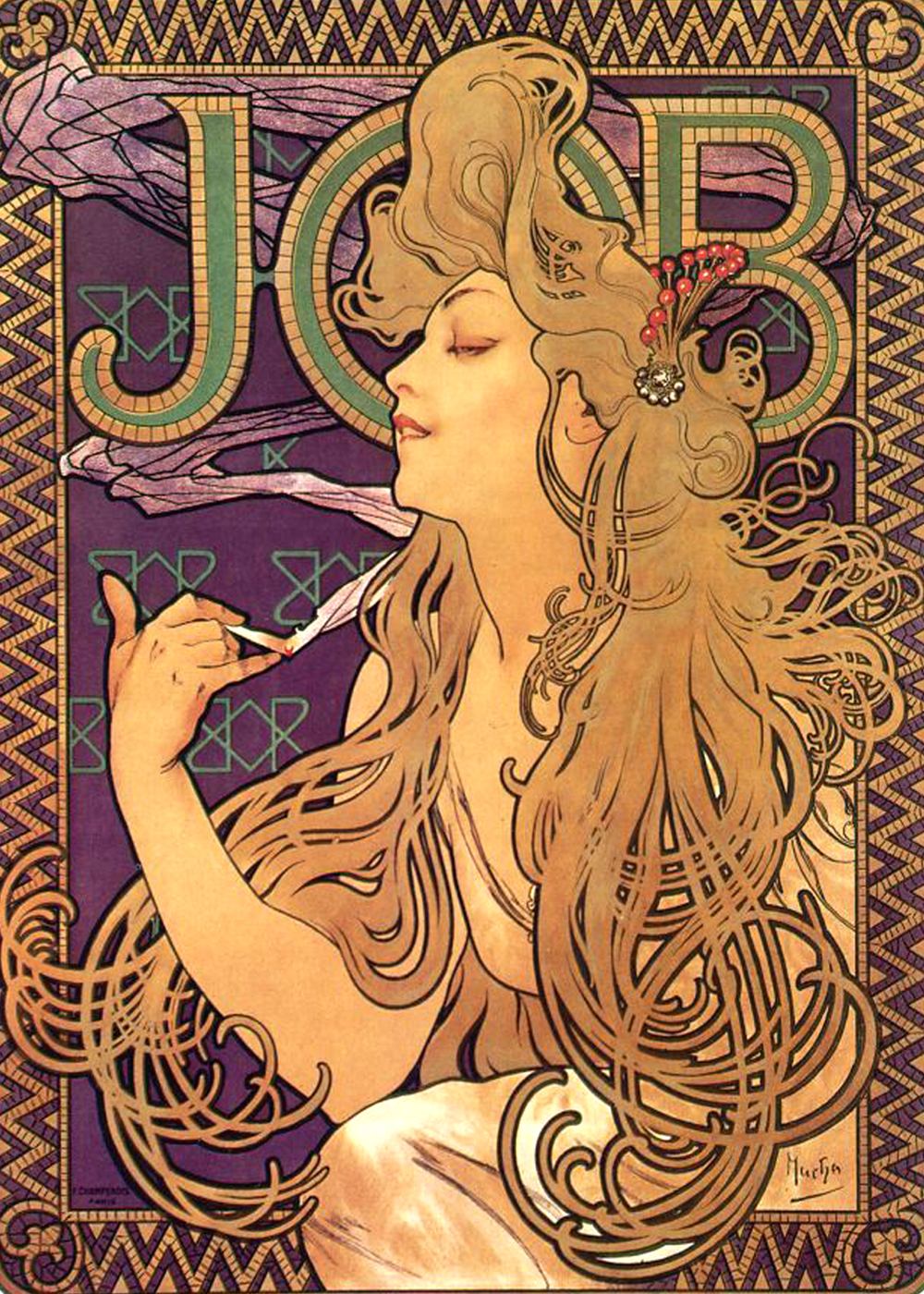
JOB cigarette papers (1898)

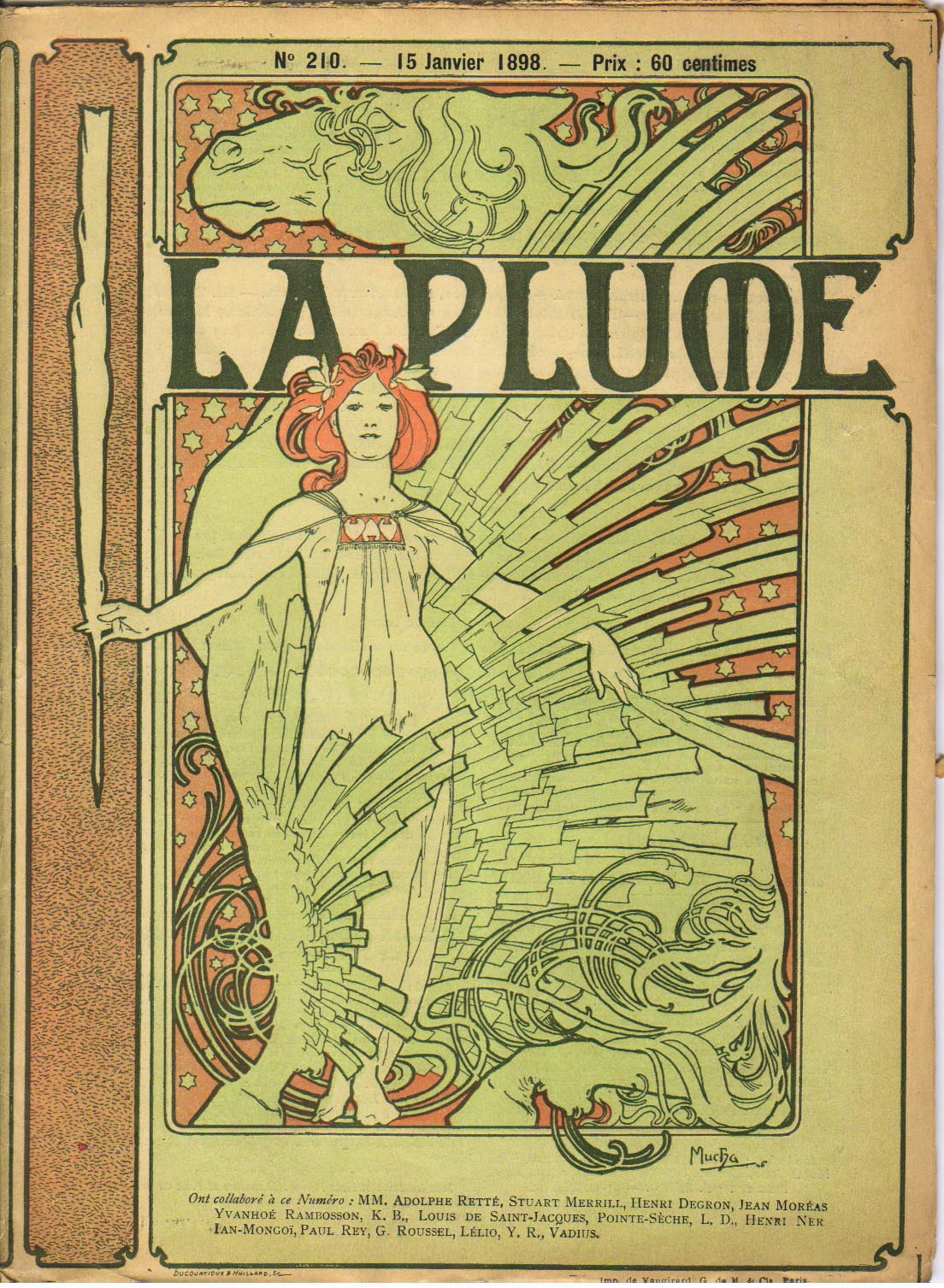
Cover design La Plume (1898)

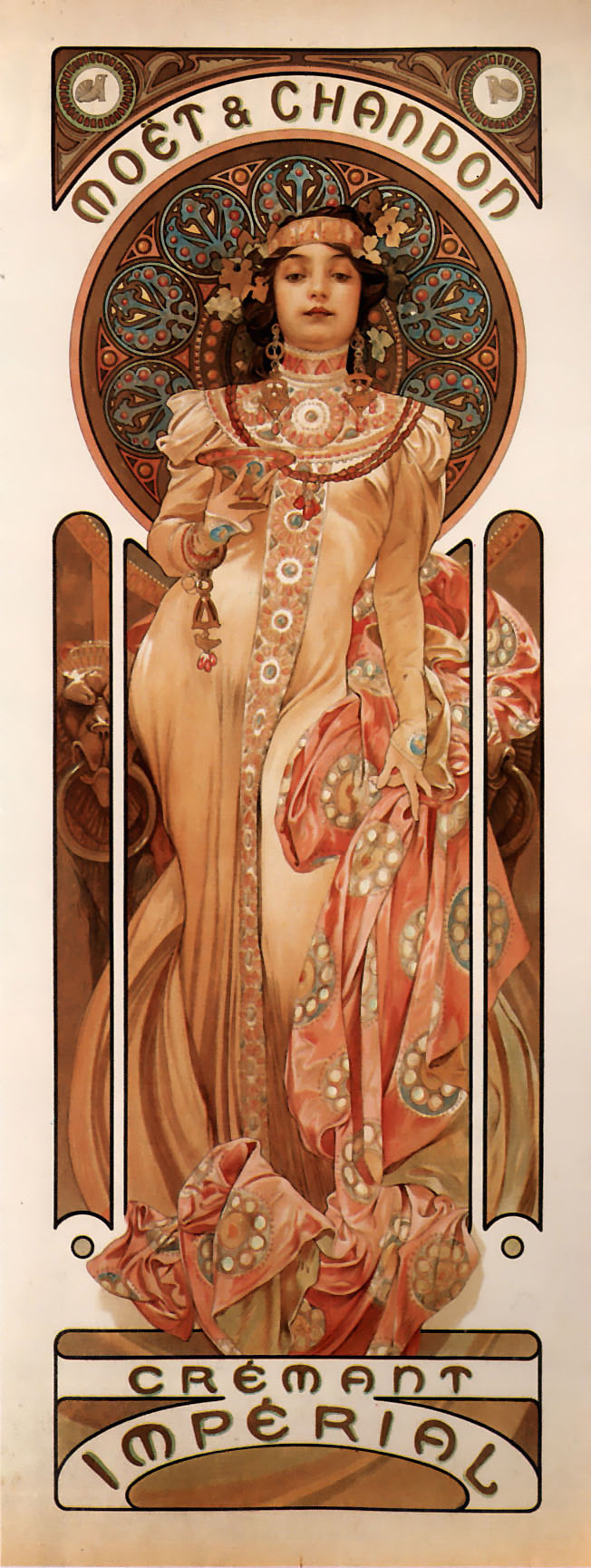
Moët & Chandon Crémant Impérial (1899)
Decorative panels

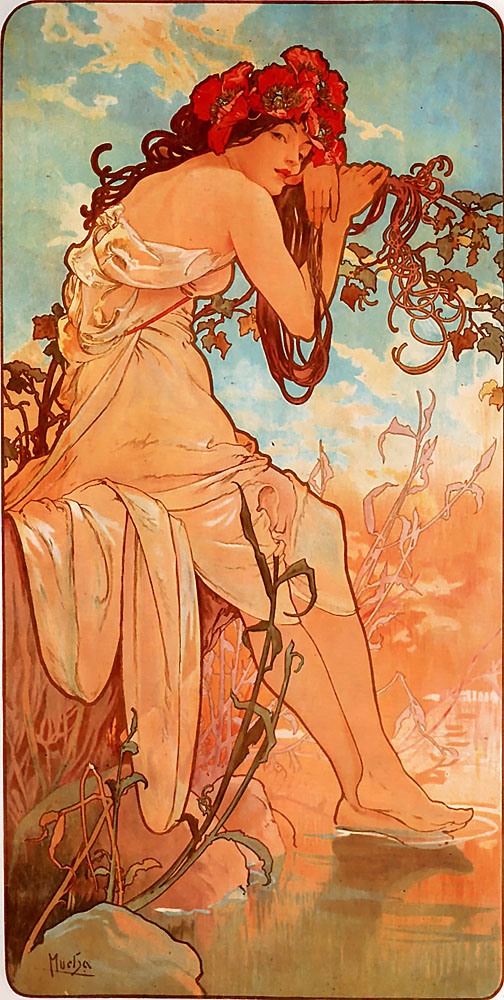
The Seasons − Summer (1896)

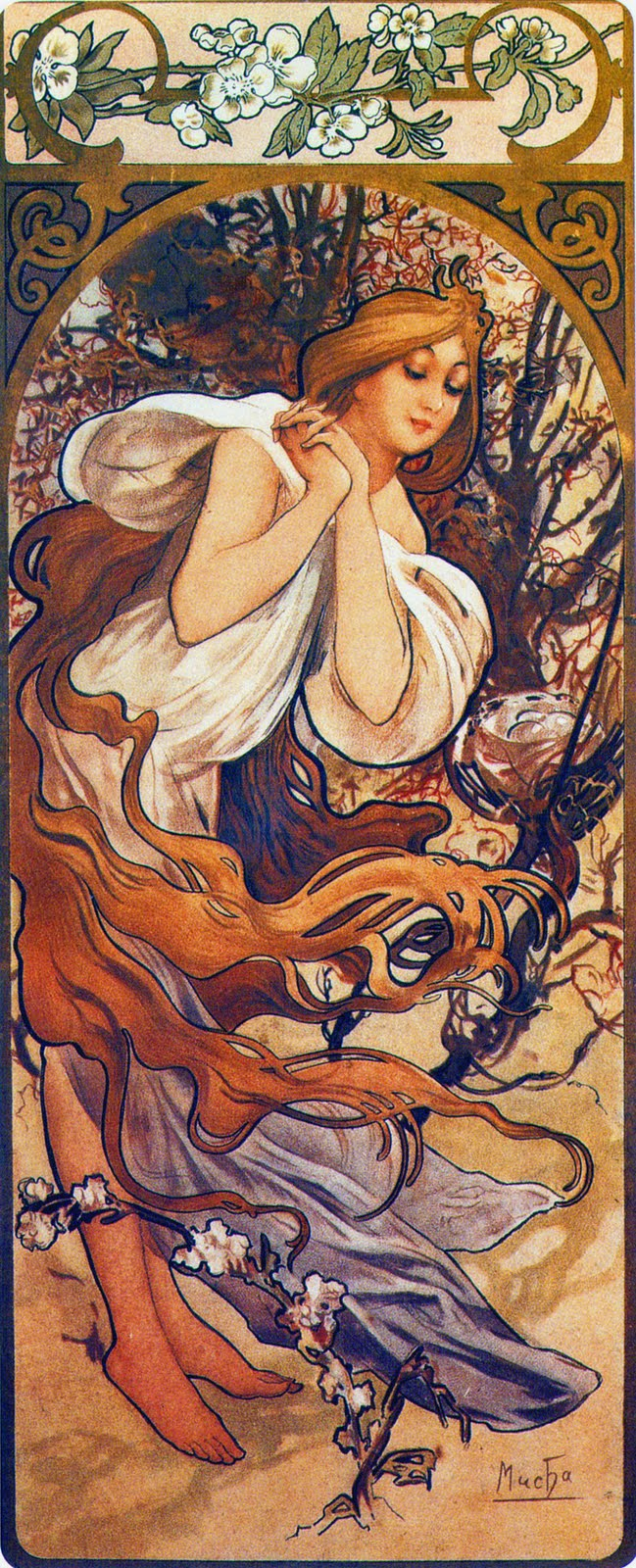
The Seasons − Spring (1897)

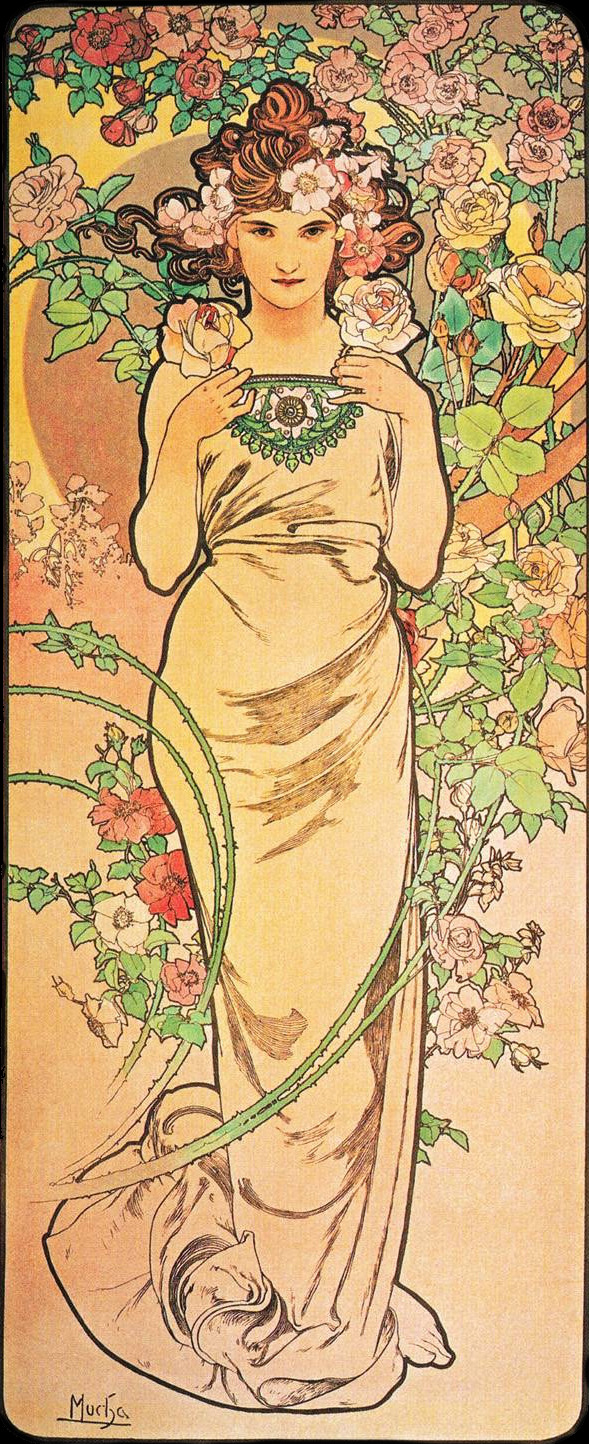
The Flowers − the Rose (1898)

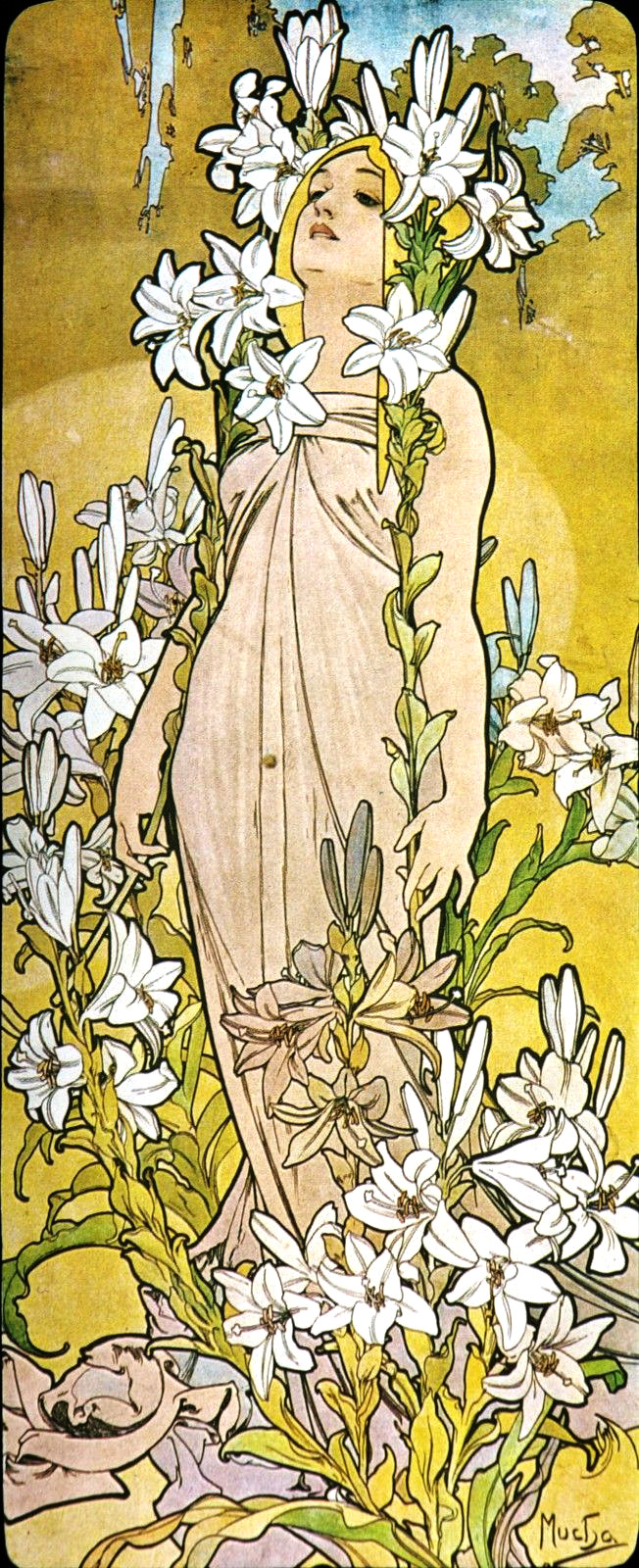
The Flowers − the Lily (1898)

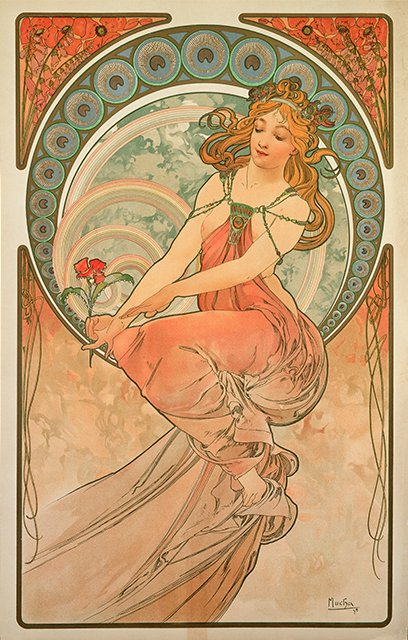
The Arts − Painting (1898)

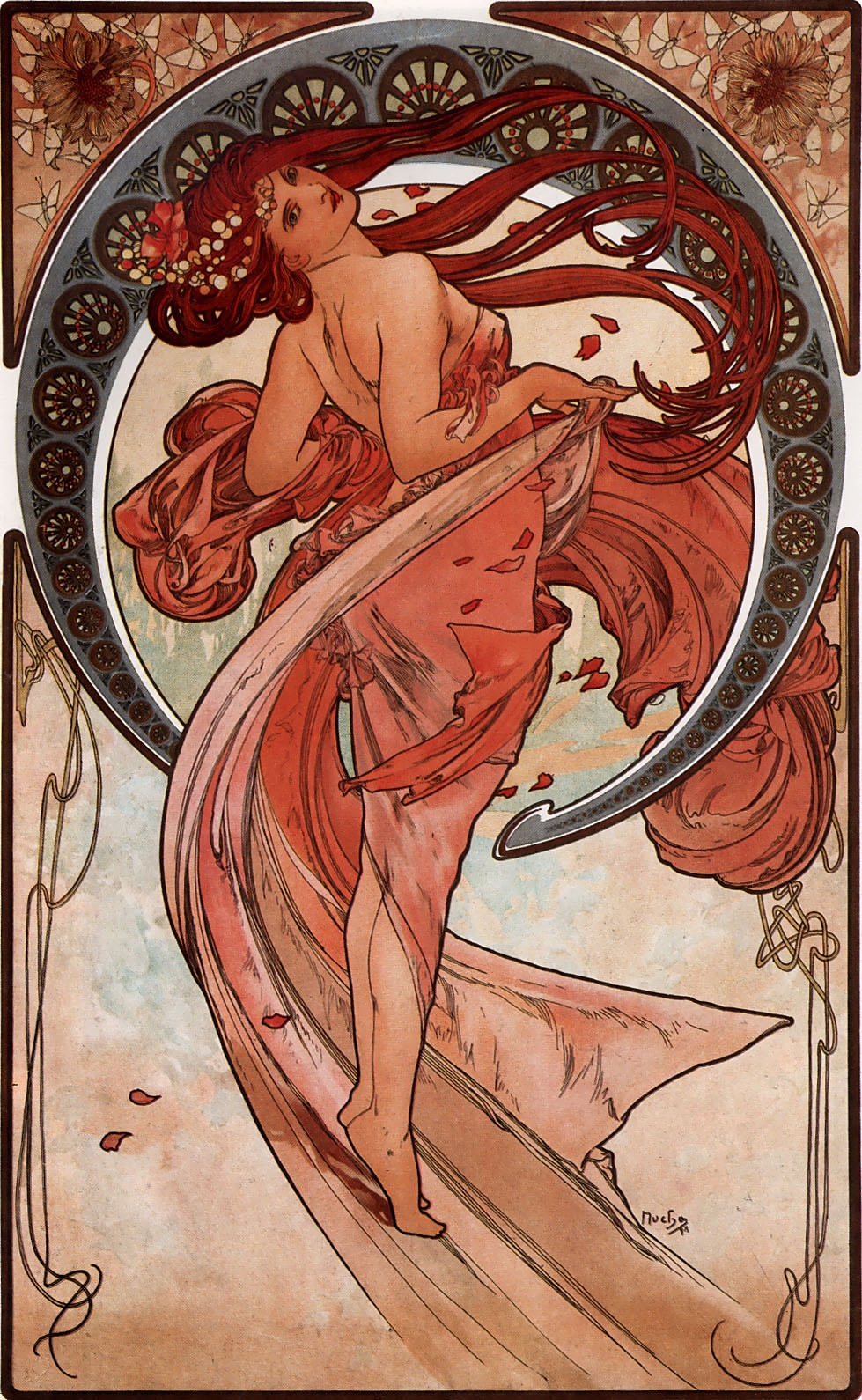
The Arts − Dance (1898)

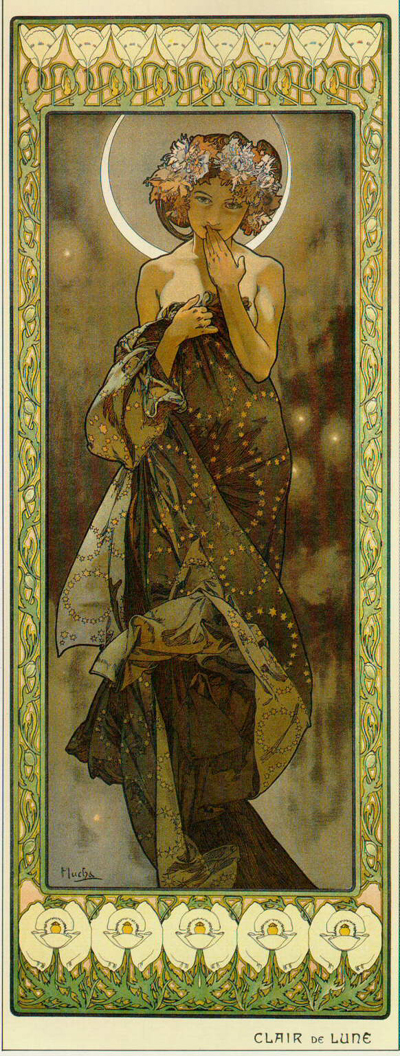
The Moon and the Stars (1902)

== Le Pater (1899) ==
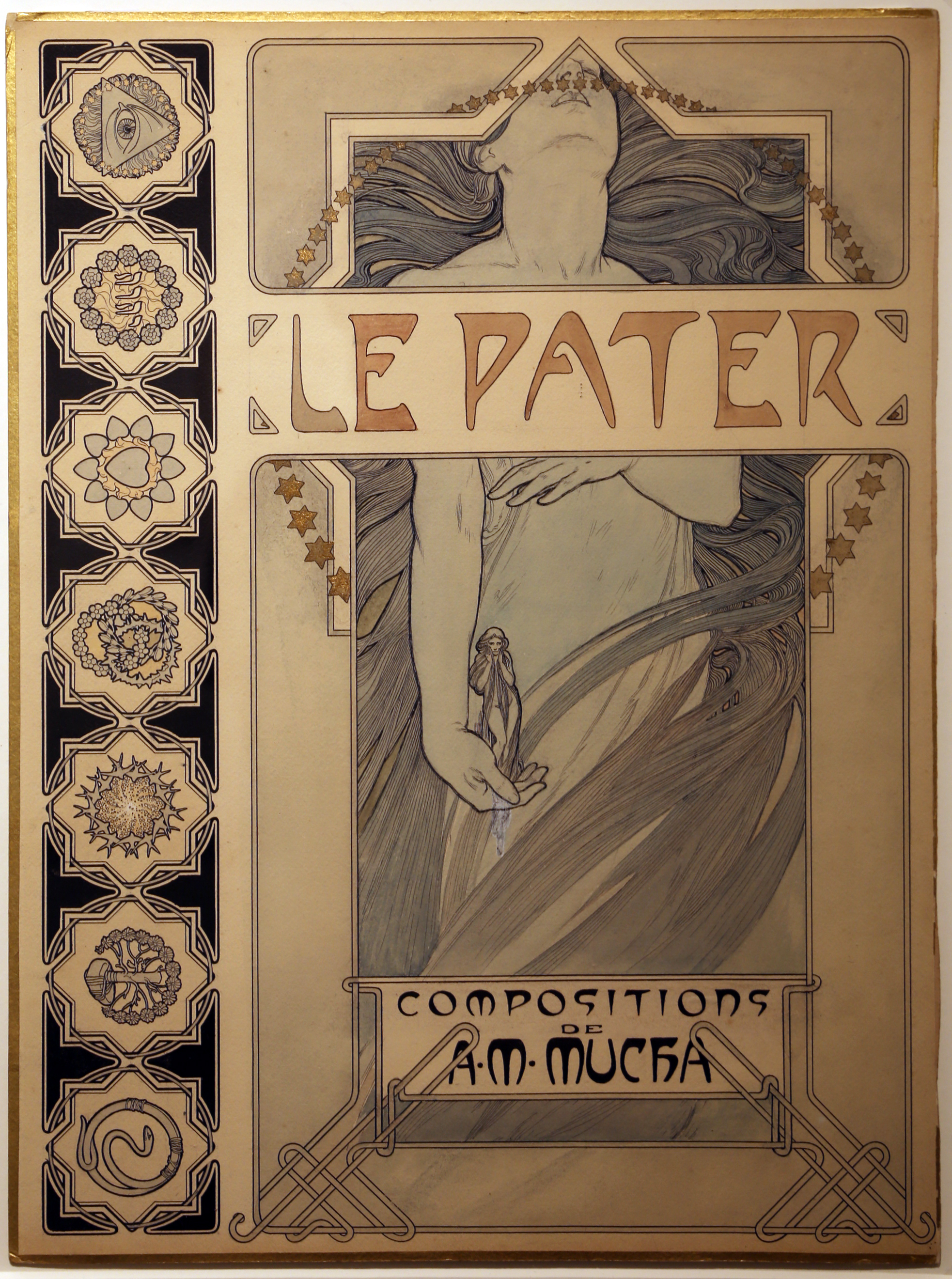
Cover of Le Pater (1899)

Mucha made a considerable income from his theatrical and advertising work, but he wished even more to be recognised as a serious artist and philosopher. He was a devoted Catholic, but also was interested in mysticism. In January 1898 he joined the Paris masonic lodge of the Grand Orient de France. Shortly before the 1900 Exposition Universelle, as he wrote in his memoirs, "I had not found any real satisfaction in my old kind of work. I saw that my way was to be found elsewhere, little bit higher. I sought a way to spread the light which reached further into even the darkest corners. I didn't have to look for very long. The Pater Noster (Lord's Prayer): why not give the words a pictorial expression?". He approached his publisher, Henri Piazza, and proposed the book, in these words: "First a cover page with symbolist ornament; then the same ornament developed in a kind a variation on each line of the prayer; a page explaining each line in a calligraphic form; and a page rendering the idea of each line in the form of an image."

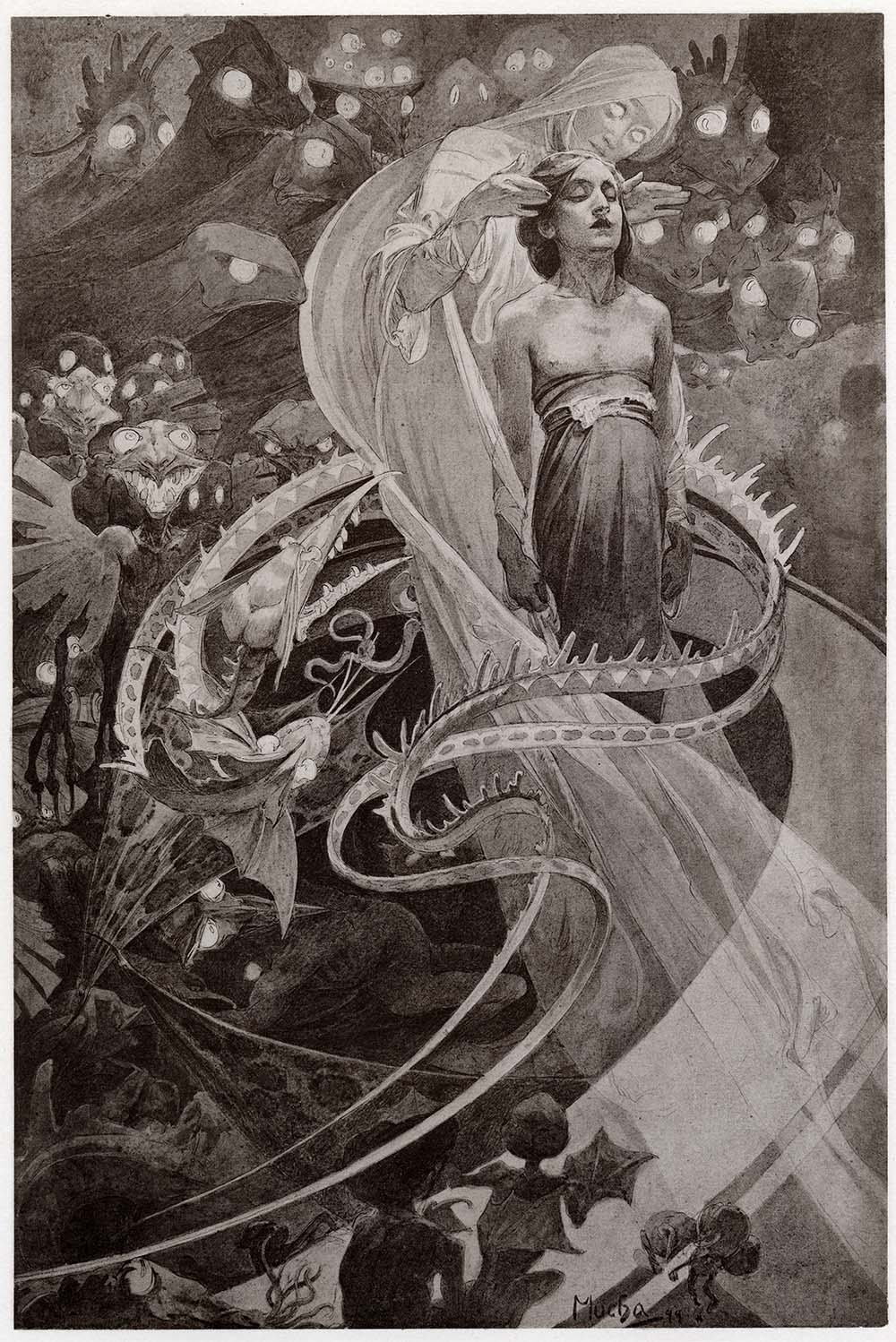
Illustration from Le Pater of "Lead us not into temptation" (1899)

Le Pater was published on 20 December 1899, only 510 copies were printed. The original watercolour paintings of the page were displayed in the Austrian pavilion at the 1900 Exposition Universelle. He considered Le Pater to be his printed masterpiece, and referred to it in the New York Sun of 5 January 1900 as a work into which he had "put his soul". Critic Charles Masson, who reviewed it for Art et Decoration, wrote: "There is in that man a visionary; it is the work of an imagination not suspected by those who only know his talent for the agreeable and charming."

== Paris Universal Exposition (1900) ==
The Paris Universal Exposition of 1900, famous as the first grand showcase of the Art Nouveau, gave Mucha an opportunity to move in an entirely different direction, toward the large-scale historical paintings which he had admired in Vienna. It also allowed him to express his Czech patriotism. His foreign name had caused much speculation in the French press, which distressed him. Sarah Bernhardt stood up on his behalf, declaring in La France that Mucha was "a Czech from Moravia not only by birth and origin, but also by feeling, by conviction and by patriotism." He applied to the Austrian government and received a commission to create murals for the Pavilion of Bosnia & Herzegovina (then under Austro-Hungarian rule) at the Exposition. This pavilion displayed examples of industry, agriculture, and culture of these provinces, which in 1878, by the Treaty of Berlin, had been taken away from Turkey and put under the tutorship of Austria. The temporary building built for the Exposition had three large halls with two levels, with a ceiling more than twelve meters high, and with natural light from skylights. Mucha's experience in theatre decoration gave him the ability to paint large-scale paintings in a short period of time.

Mucha's original concept was a group of murals depicting the suffering of the Slavic inhabitants of the region caused by the occupation by foreign powers. The sponsors of the exhibit, the Austrian government, the new occupier of the region, declared that this was a little pessimistic for a World's Fair. He changed his project to depict a future society in the Balkans where Catholic and Orthodox Christians and Muslims lived in harmony together; this was accepted, and he began work. Mucha immediately departed for the Balkans to make sketches of Balkan costumes, ceremonies, and architecture, which he put into his new work. His decoration included one large allegorical painting, Bosnia Offers Her Products to the Universal Exposition, and an additional set of murals on three walls, showing the history and cultural development of the region. He did discreetly include some images of the sufferings of the Bosnians under foreign rule, which appear in the arched band at the top of the mural. As he had done with his theatre work, he often took photographs of posed models and painted from them, simplifying the forms. Whereas the work depicted dramatic events, the overall impression that it gave was one of serenity and harmony. In addition to the murals, Mucha also designed a menu for the restaurant of the Bosnia & Herzegovina Pavilion.

His work appeared in many forms at the Exposition. Besides the posters for the official Austrian participation in the Exposition and the menu for the restaurant at the Bosnian pavilion and for the official opening banquet, he also produced displays for the jeweller Georges Fouquet and the perfume maker Houbigant, with statuettes and panels of women depicting the scents of rose, orange blossom, violet, and buttercup. His more serious artworks, including his drawings for Le Pater, were shown in the Austrian Pavilion and in the Austrian section of the Grand Palais.

His work at the Exposition earned him the title of Knight of the Order of Franz Joseph from the Austrian government, and he was named to the Legion of Honour by the French government. During the course of the Exposition, Mucha proposed another unusual project. The French Government planned to take down the Eiffel Tower, built especially for the Exposition, as soon as the event ended. Mucha proposed that, after the Exposition, the top of the tower should be replaced by a sculptural monument to humanity constructed on the pedestal. However, the tower proved to be popular with both tourists and Parisians, and it was left in its original form after the Exhibit ended.

Paris Universal Exposition - Bosnia & Herzegovina Pavilion (1900)

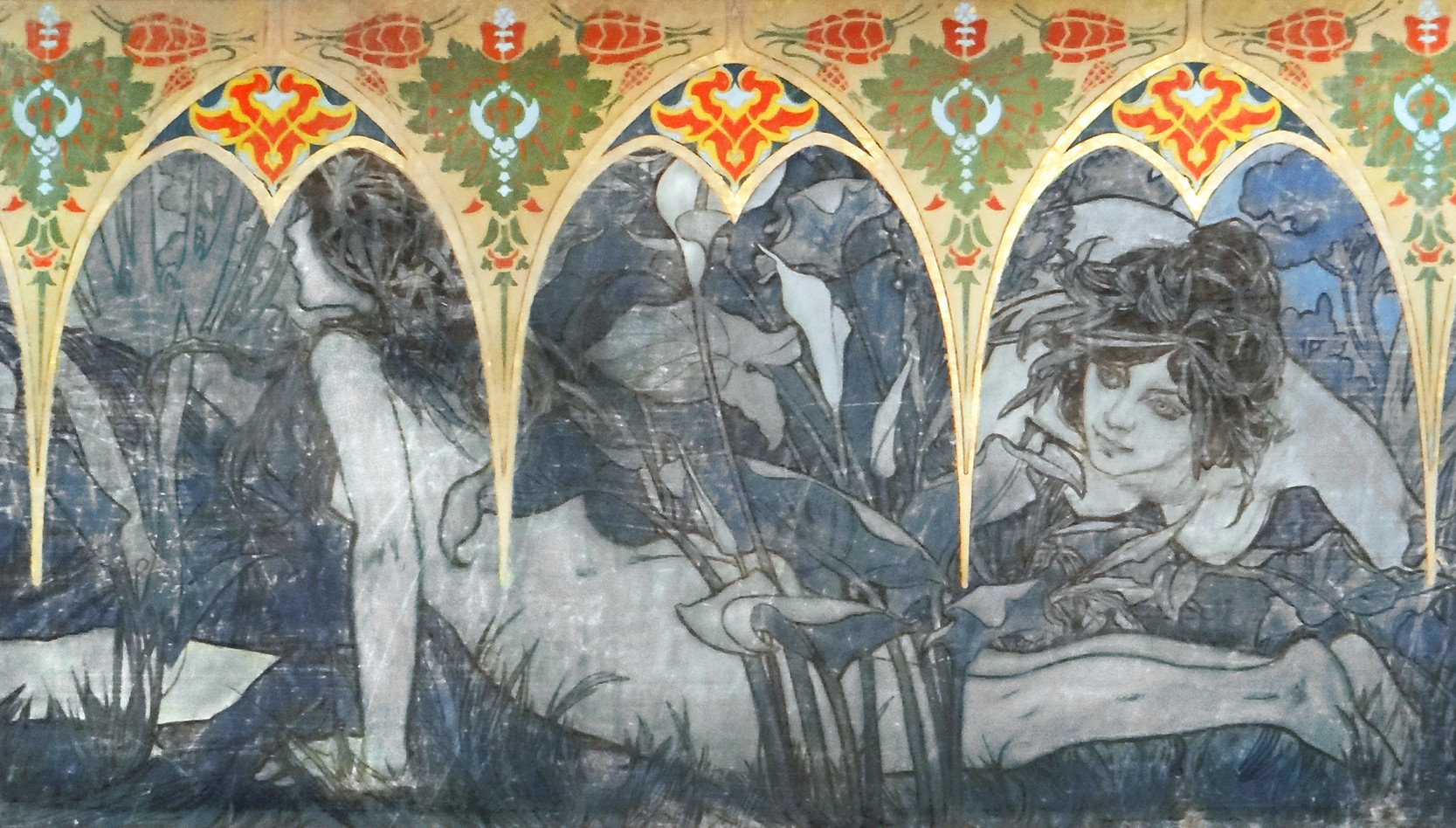
A scene from the decoration, Petit Palais Museum Paris

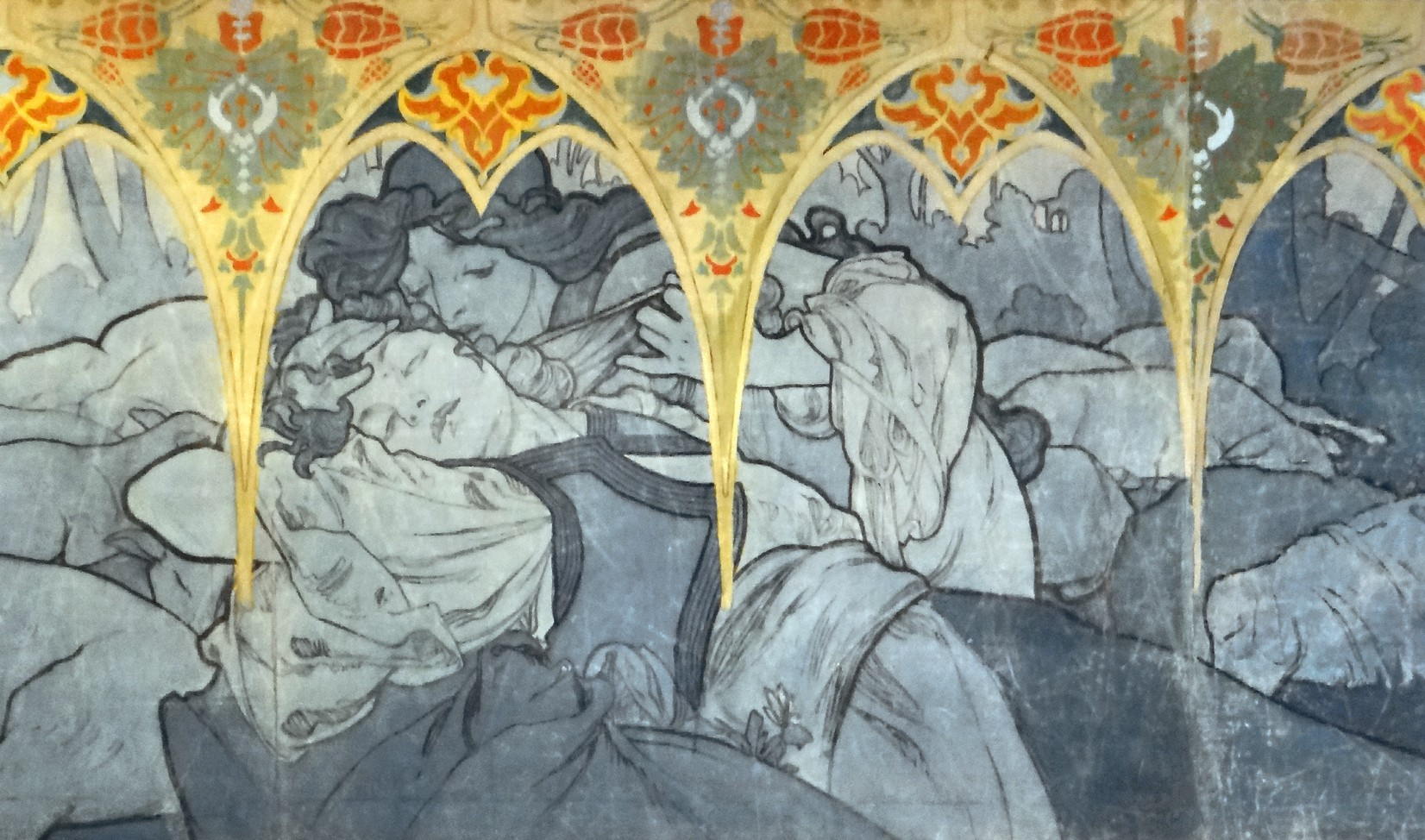
Mural, Petit Palais Museum Paris

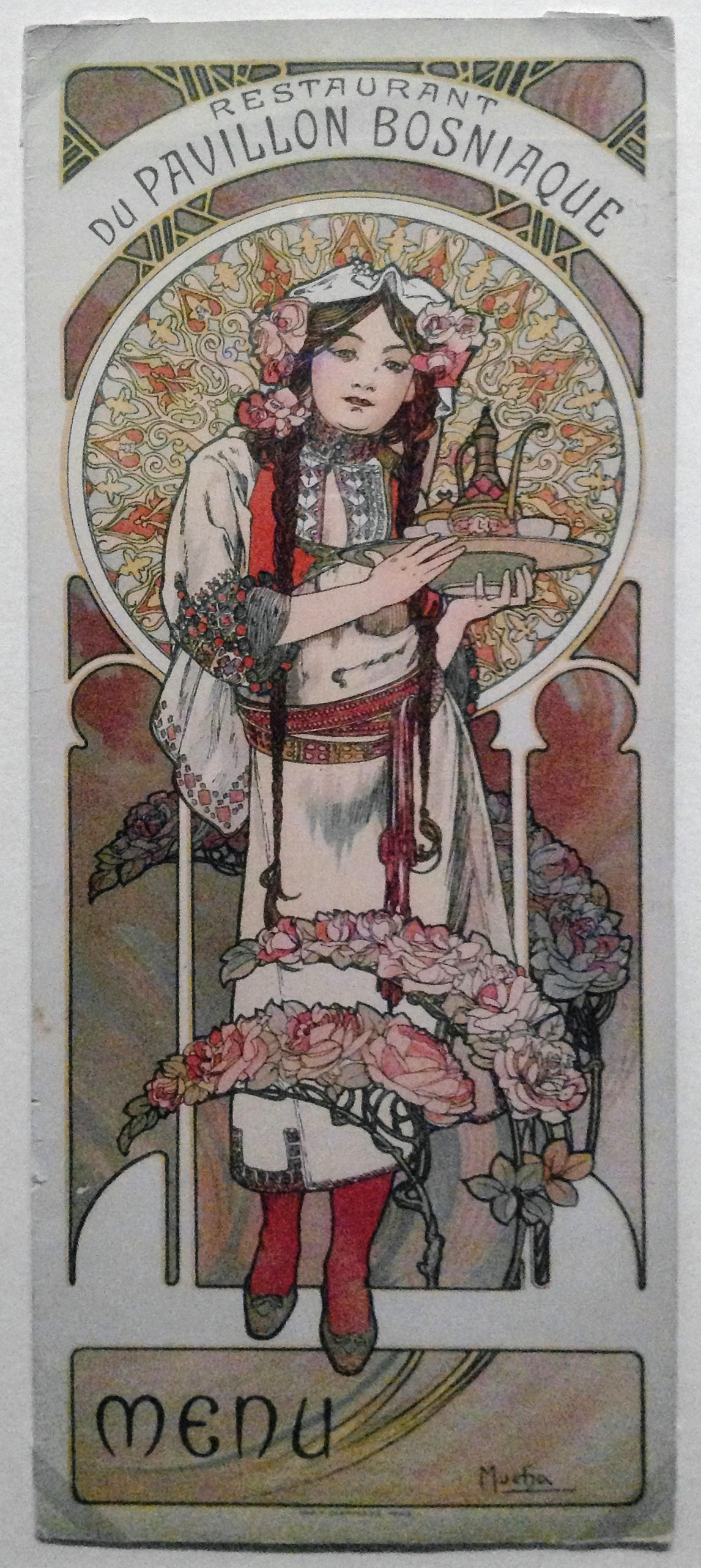
Restaurant menu

== Jewellery and Documents Decoratifs (1902) ==
Mucha's many interests included jewellery. Around 1900 he had begun to teach at the Academy Colarossi, where he himself had been a student when he first arrived in Paris. His course was precisely described in the catalogue: "The object of the Mucha course is to permit the student to have the necessary knowledge for artistic decoration, applied to decorative panels, windows, porcelain, enamels, furniture, jewellery, posters, etc." In 1899, he collaborated with the jeweller Georges Fouquet to make a bracelet for Sarah Bernhardt in the form of a serpent, made of gold and enamel, similar to the costume jewellery Bernhardt had worn in Medea. According to Jiří Mucha, this bracelet was created to conceal Bernhardt's arthritic wrist. The spiralling design of the snake is a nod to Mucha's swirling Art Nouveau painting style. The Cascade pendant designed for Fouquet (1900) is in the form of a waterfall, composed of gold, enamel, opals, tiny diamonds, paillons, and a barocco (misshapen pearl). After the 1900 Exposition, Fouquet decided to open a new shop at 6 Rue Royale. He asked Mucha to design the interior.

The centrepieces of the design were two peacocks, the traditional symbol of luxury, made of bronze and wood with coloured glass decoration. To the side was a shell-shaped fountain, with three gargoyles spouting water into basins, surrounding the statue of a nude woman. The salon was further decorated with carved mouldings and stained glass, thin columns with vegetal designs, and a ceiling with moulded floral and vegetal elements. It marked a summit of Art Nouveau decoration.

The shop opened in 1901, just as tastes were beginning to change, moving away from Art Nouveau to more naturalistic patterns. It was taken apart in 1923, and a replaced by a more traditional shop design. Fortunately most of the original decoration was preserved, and was donated in 1914 and 1949 to the Carnavalet Museum in Paris, where it can be seen today.

Georges Fouquet's jewellery shop

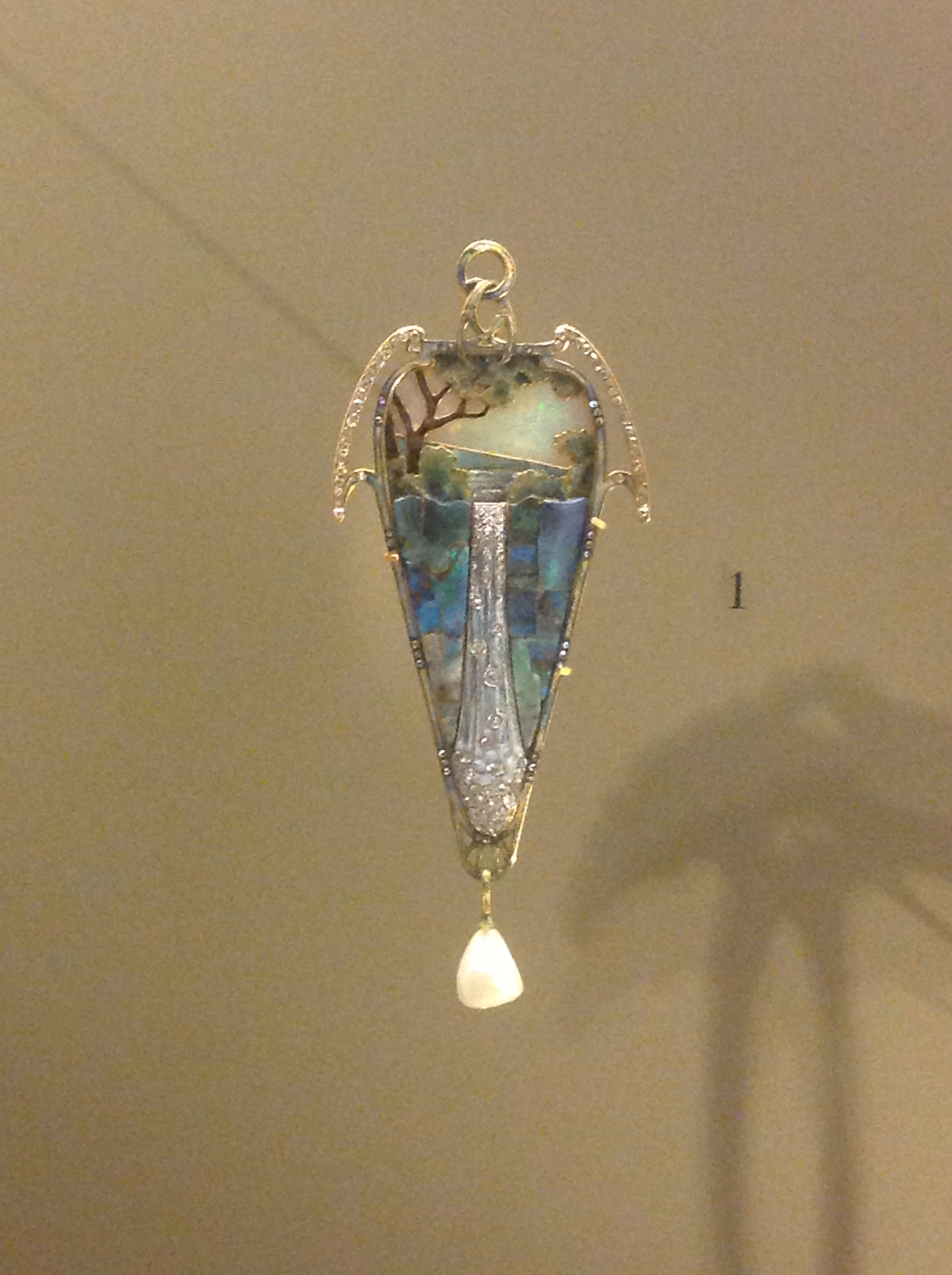
Cascade pendant (1900), Petit Palais Museum Paris

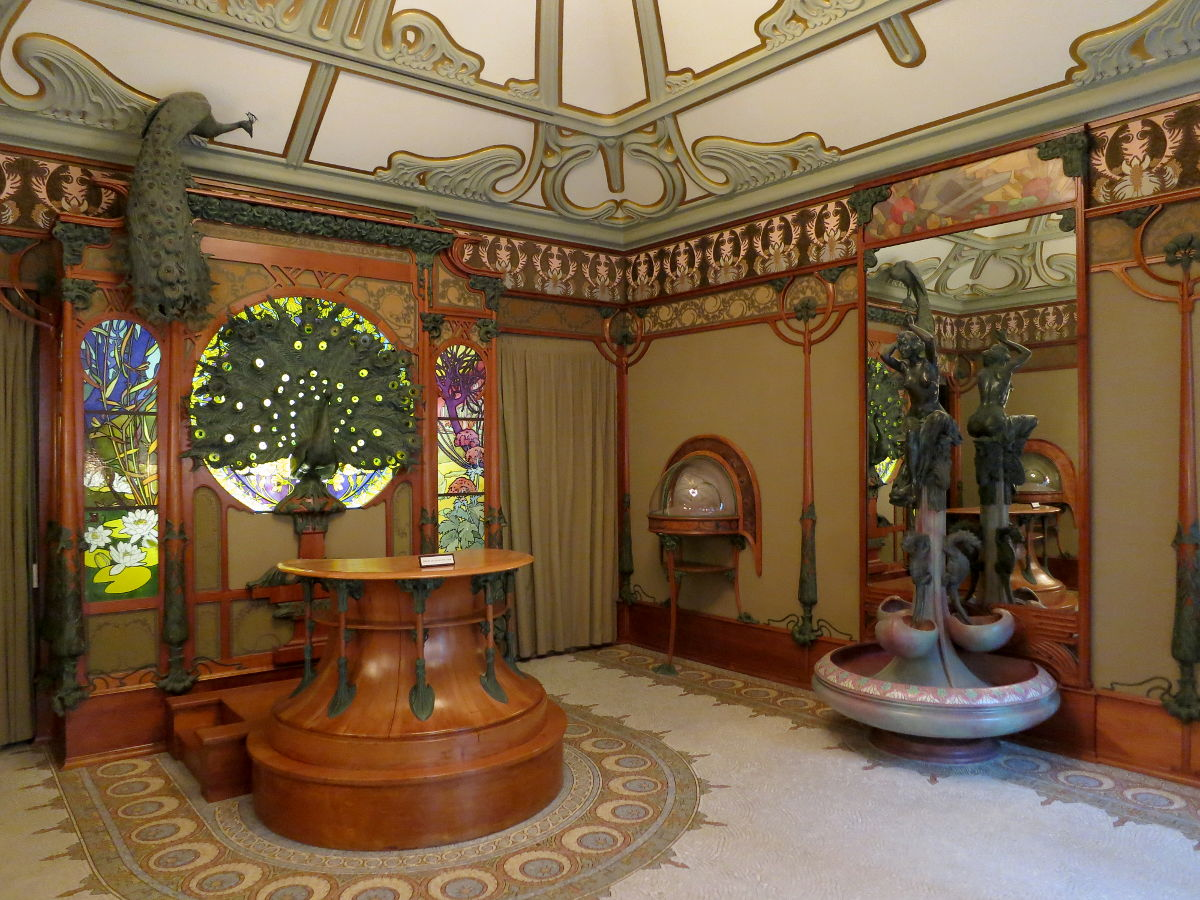
Interior (1901)

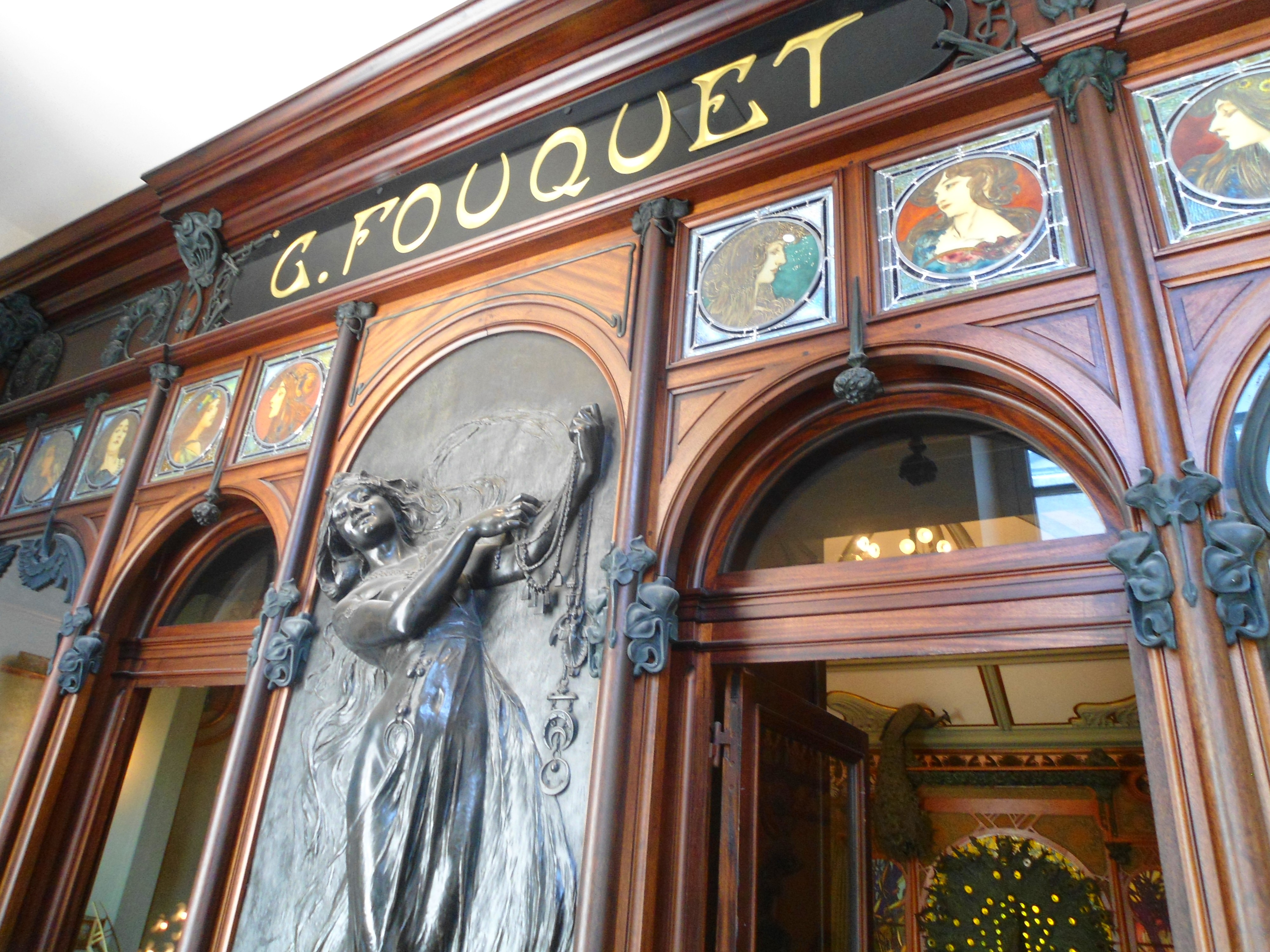
Detail decoration (1901)

Mucha's next project was a series of seventy-two printed plates in watercolour, titled Documents Decoratifs, which were published as a book in 1902 by the Central Library of Fine Arts. The plates contained elaborate designs for brooches and other pieces, with swirling arabesques and vegetal forms, and incrustations of enamel and coloured stones. They represented ways that floral, vegetal and natural forms could be used in decoration and decorative objects.

Documents Décoratifs book (1901/'02)

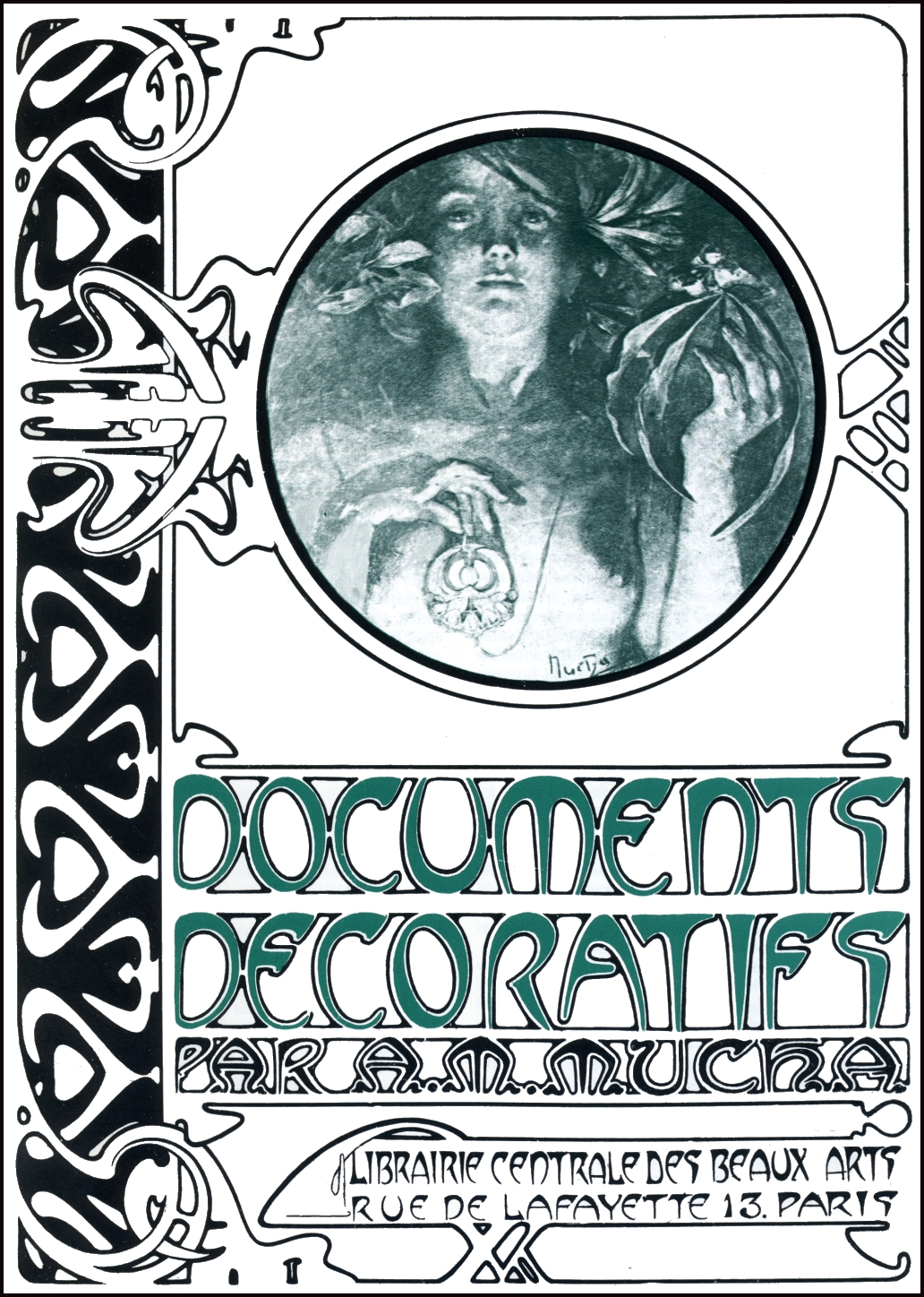
Cover

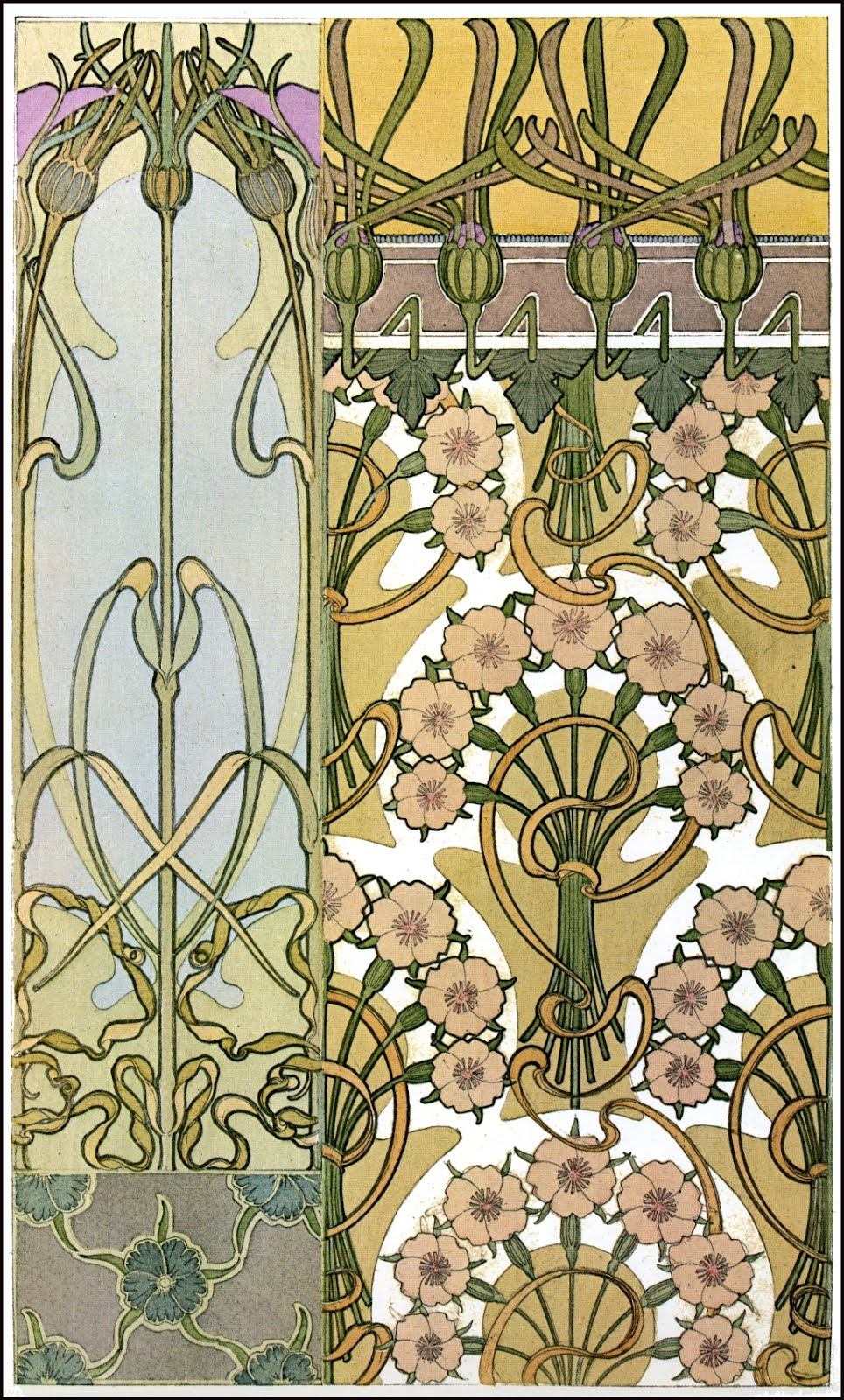
Pattern

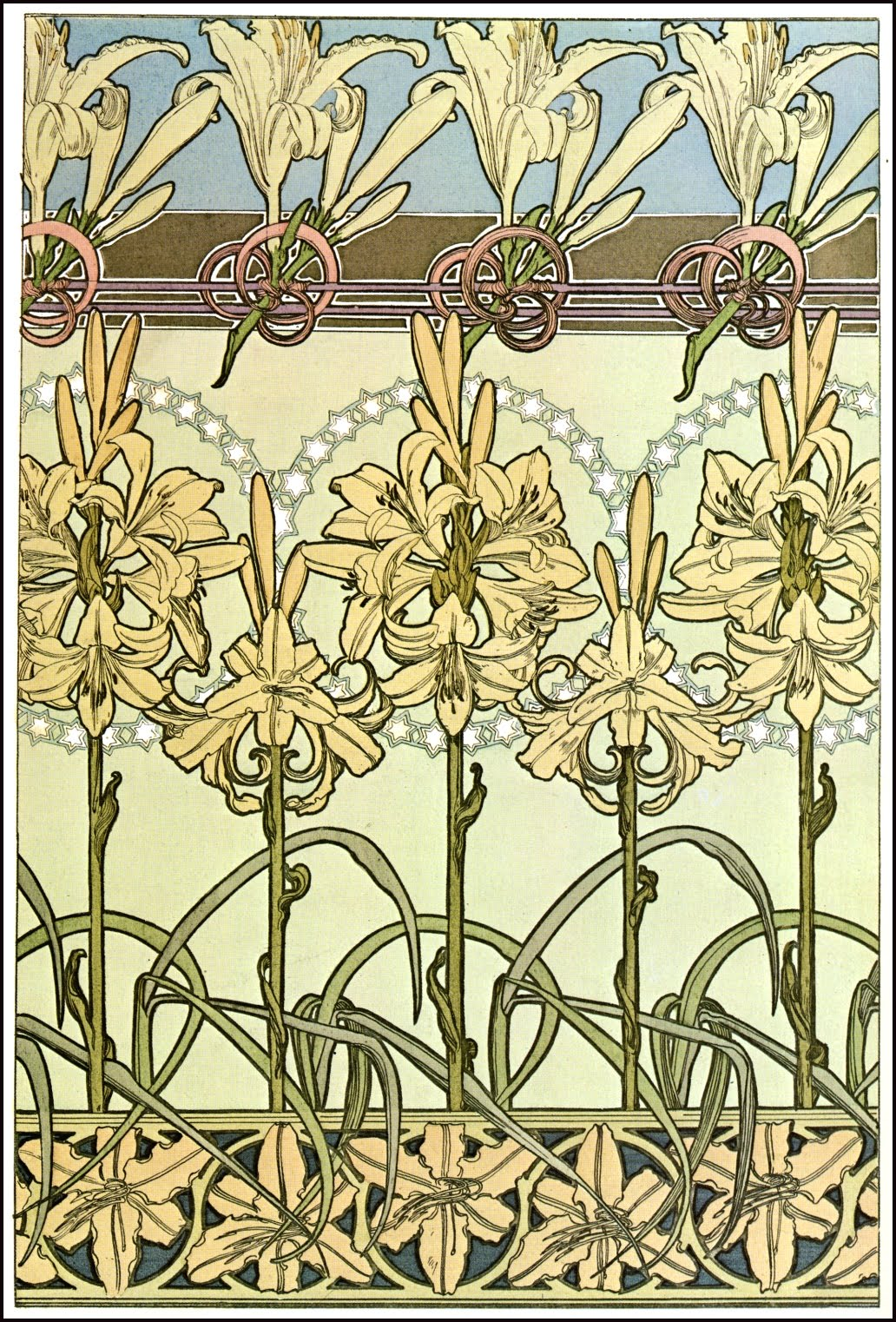
Pattern

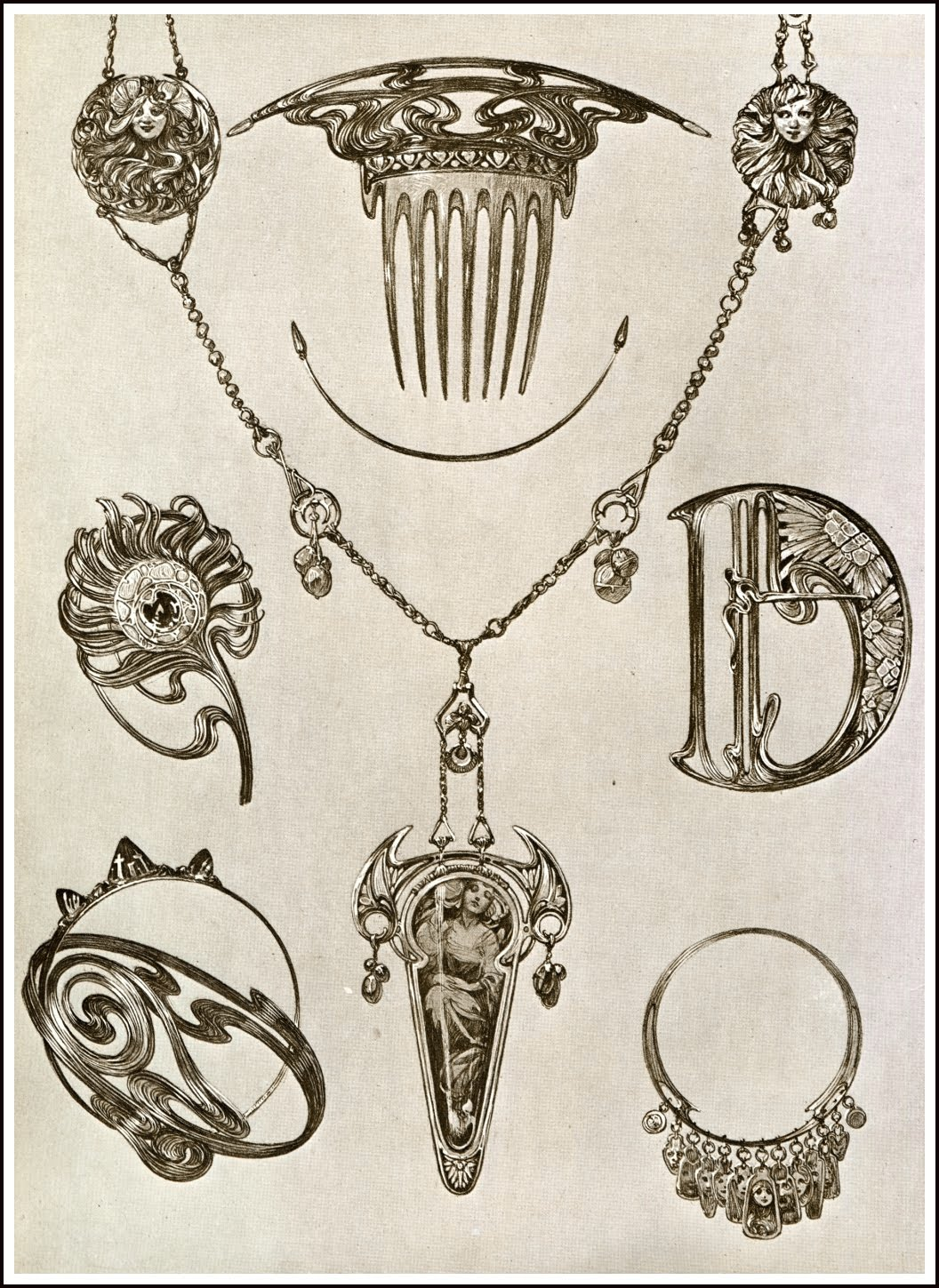
Jewellery designs

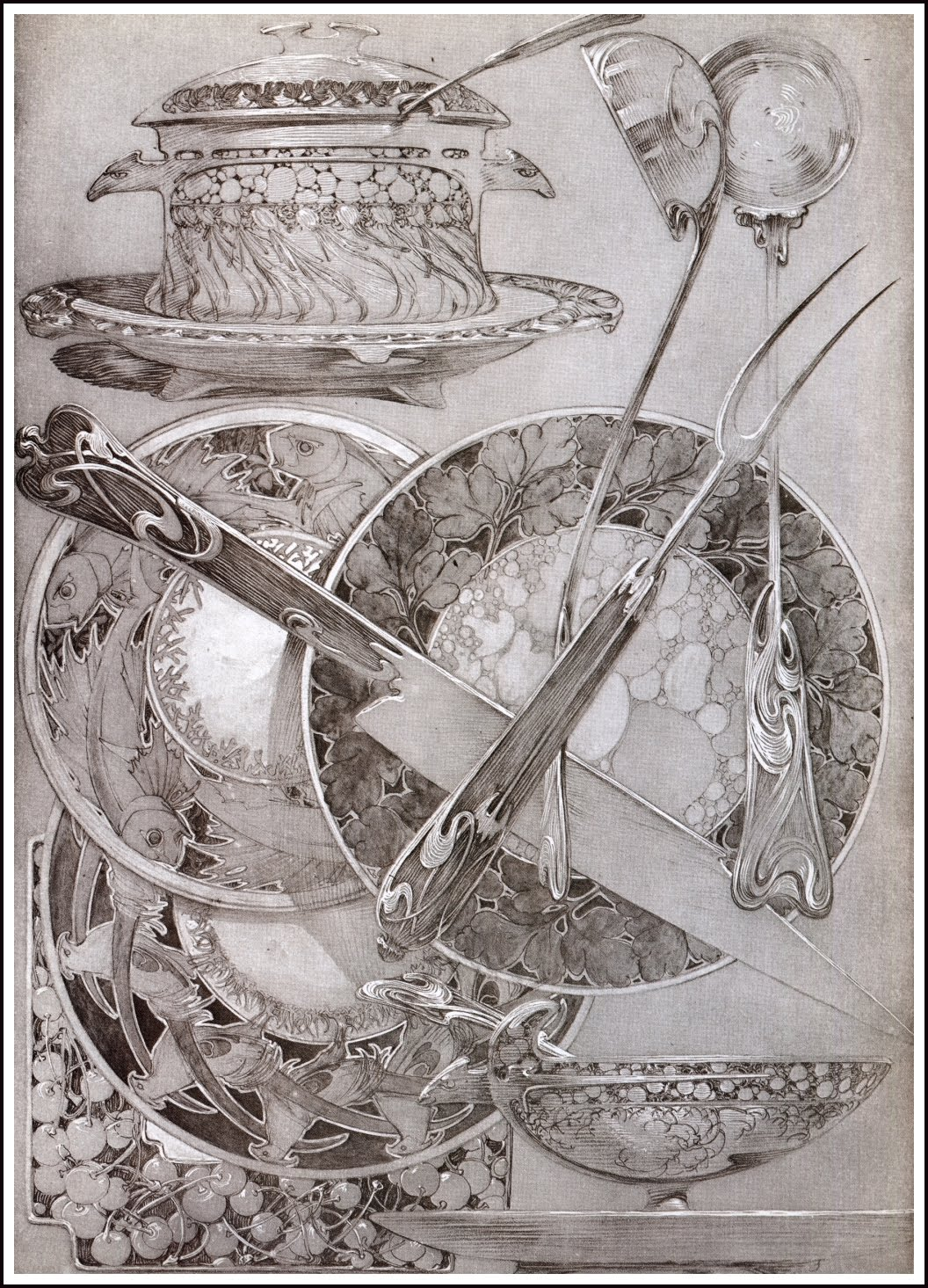
Ideas for dish ware

== Marriage and trips to the U.S. (1904–1909) ==
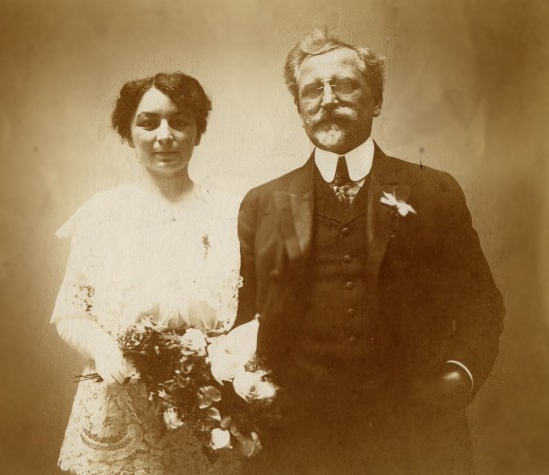
Mucha and his wife on their wedding day (1906)

On 10 June 1906, he married his wife Marie Chytilová (Note: Also as Maria or Maruška.) in Prague. Their first child, daughter Jaroslava, was born in New York in 1909. Their son Jiří Mucha was born in Prague in 1915.

Whilst living in Paris, Mucha made five trips to the U.S., between 1904 and 1909, usually staying for five to six months. (Note: From New York, he wrote to his family in Moravia: "You must have been very surprised by my decision to come to the U.S., perhaps even amazed. But in fact I had been preparing to come here for some time. It had become clear to me that that I would never have time to do the things I wanted to do if I did not get away from the treadmill of Paris, I would be constantly bound to publishers and their whims...in the U.S., I don't expect to find wealth, comfort, or fame for myself, only the opportunity to do some more useful work.") His intent was to find funding for his grand project, The Slav Epic, which he had conceived during the 1900 Exposition. He had letters of introduction from Baroness Salomon de Rothschild. In March 1904, Mucha sailed for New York, and when he landed, he was already a celebrity in the United States; his posters had been widely displayed during Sarah Bernhardt's annual U.S. tours since 1896. He rented a studio near Central Park, made portraits, and gave interviews and lectures. He still had commissions to complete in France, and returned to Paris at the end of May 1904. He continued taking trips to the U.S. until 1909, and after his marriage in 1906, his wife would join him as well.

His principal income in the United States came from teaching; he taught illustration and design at the New York School of Applied Design for Women, at the Philadelphia School of Art for five weeks, and became a visiting professor at the Art Institute of Chicago. He made posters for the U.S. actress Mrs. Leslie Carter (known as 'The U.S. Sarah Bernhardt') and the Broadway star Maude Adams, but they were largely echoes of his Bernhardt posters. He rejected most commercial proposals, but accepted one proposal in 1906 to design boxes and a store display for Savon Mucha, a soap bar. In 1908, he undertook one large decoration project, for the interior of the German Theatre of New York; he produced three large allegorical murals, in the Art Nouveau style, representing 'Tragedy', 'Comedy', and 'Truth'. Besides the decoration, he made graphic designs, stage and costume designs. Artistically, the trip was not a success; portrait painting was not his strong point, and the German Theatre closed in 1909, one year after it opened.

He also made contact with Pan-Slavic organisations. At one Pan-Slavic banquet in New York City, he met Charles Richard Crane, a wealthy businessman and philanthropist, who was a passionate Slavophile. More importantly, he shared Mucha's enthusiasm for a series of monumental paintings on Slavic history, and he became Mucha's most important patron. He commissioned Mucha to make a portrait of his daughter Josephine Crane Bradley, in the character of Slavia, in Slavic costume and surrounded by symbols from Slavic folklore. This is often considered to be his finest work during his trips to the U.S. When Mucha designed the Czechoslovak banknotes, he used his portrait of Crane's daughter as the model for Slavia for the 100 koruna note. His contact with Crane made possible his most ambitious artistic project, The Slav Epic.

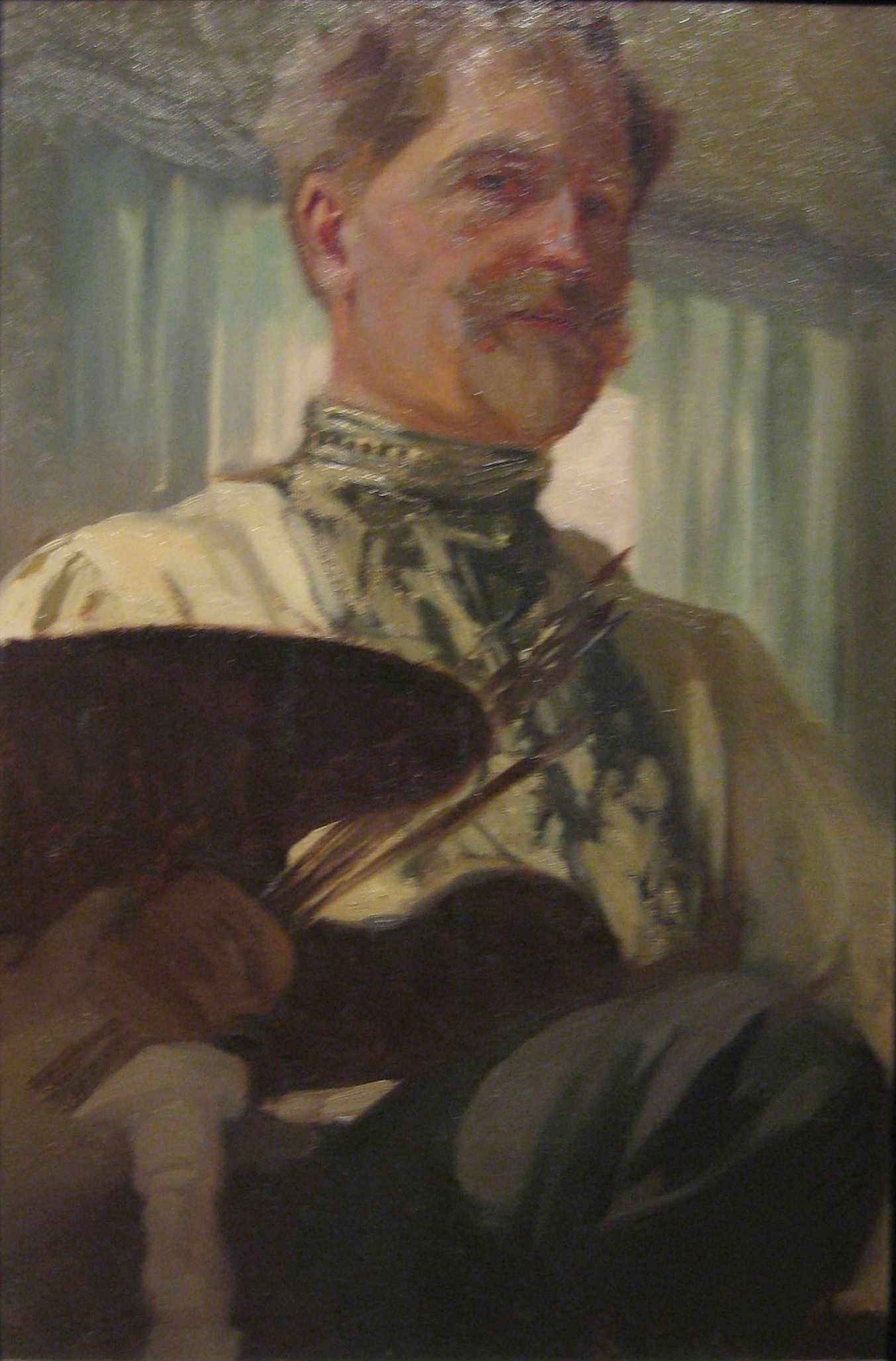
Self-portrait at work (1907)

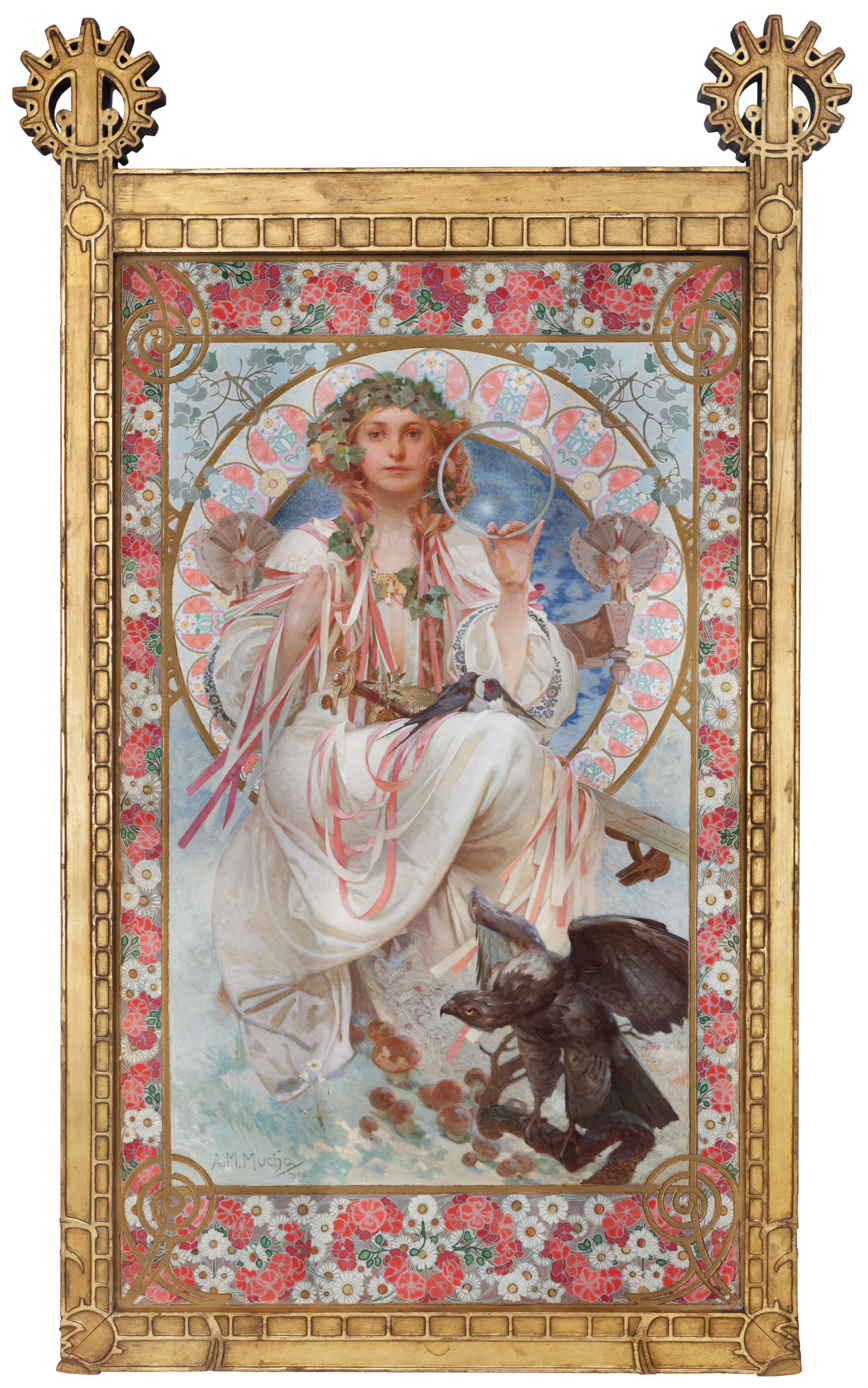
Painting of Josephine Crane Bradley as Slavia (1908)

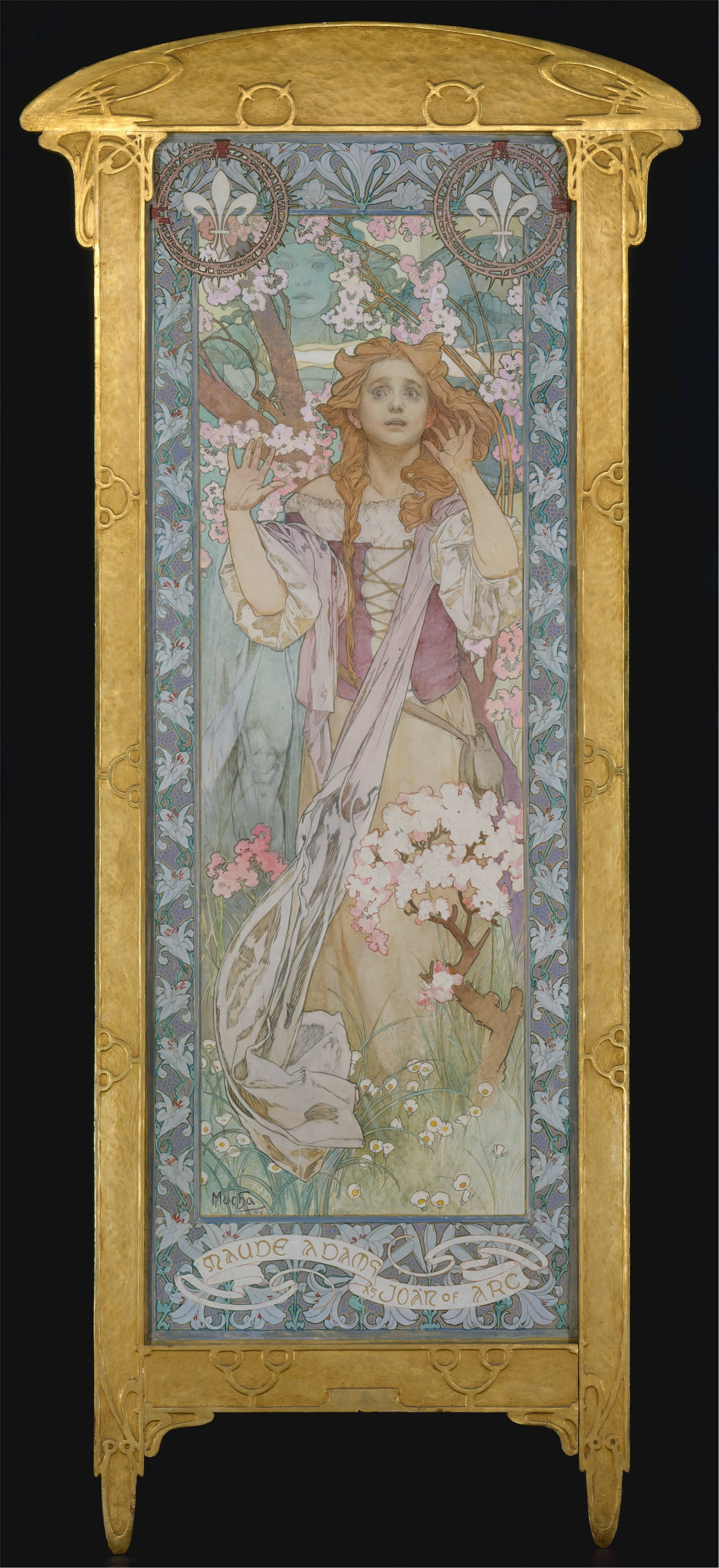
Poster of actress Maude Adams as Joan of Arc (1909)

== Prague and The Slav Epic (1910–1928) ==
During his long stay in Paris from 1887 to 1910, Mucha had never given up his dream of being a history painter and to illustrate accomplishments of the Slavic peoples of Europe. He completed his plans for The Slav Epic in 1908 and 1909, and in February 1910, Charles Crane agreed to fund the project. In 1909, he had been offered a commission to paint murals on the interior of the new city hall of Prague. He made the decision to return to his old country, still then part of the Austrian Empire. He wrote to his wife, "I will be able to do something really good, not just for the art critic but for our Slav souls."

In 1910 he moved to Prague, to start his project of the decoration of the reception room of the city's mayor in the Municipal House. This quickly became controversial, because local Prague artists resented the work being given to an artist they considered an outsider. A compromise was reached, whereby he decorated the Lord Mayor's Hall, while the other artists decorated the other rooms. He designed and created a series of large-scale murals for the domed ceiling and walls with athletic figures in heroic poses, depicting the contributions of Slavs to European history over the centuries, and the theme of Slavic unity. These paintings on the ceiling and walls were in sharp contrast to his Parisian work, and were designed to send a patriotic message.

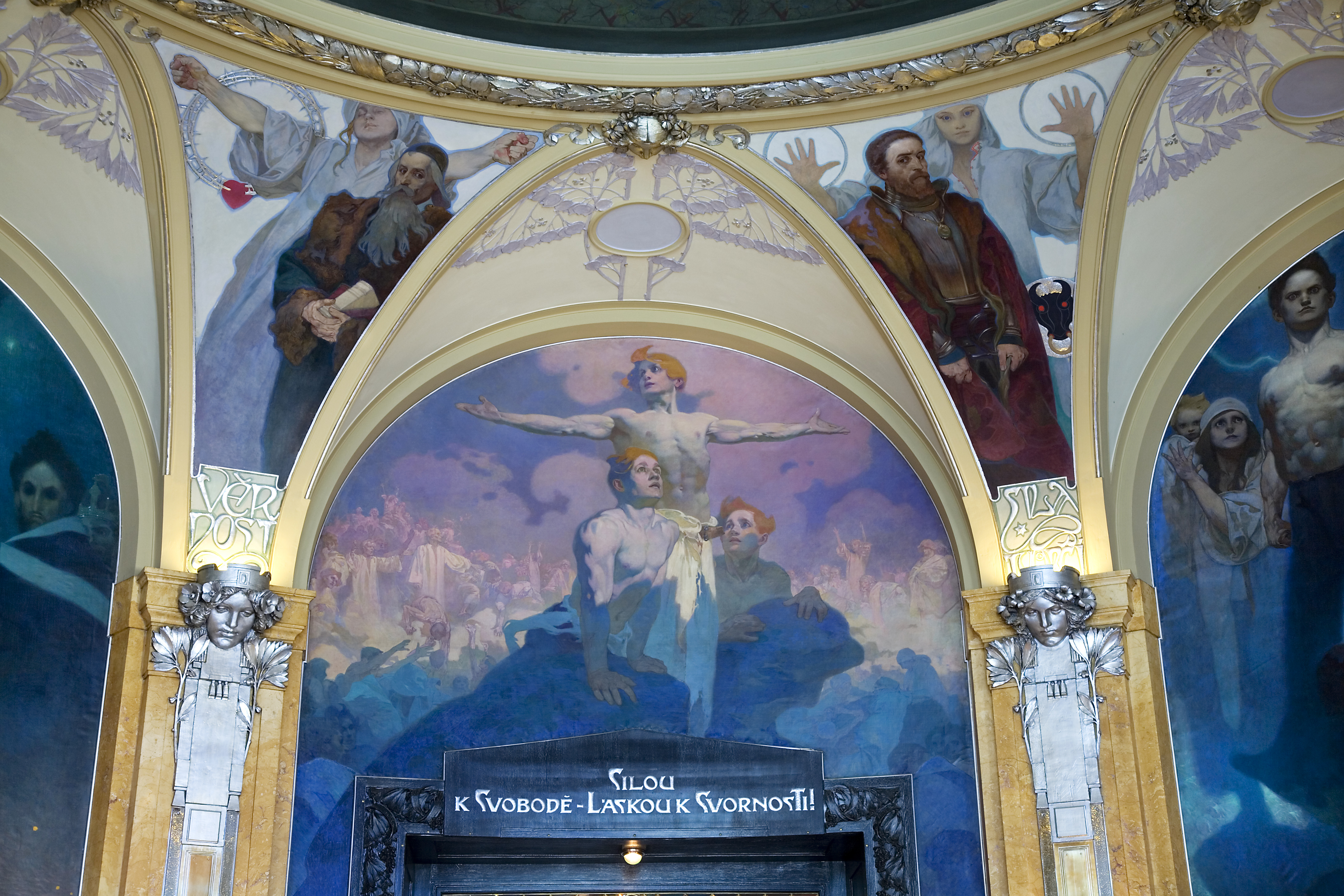
Decorated ceiling of Municipal House, Prague (1910–'12)

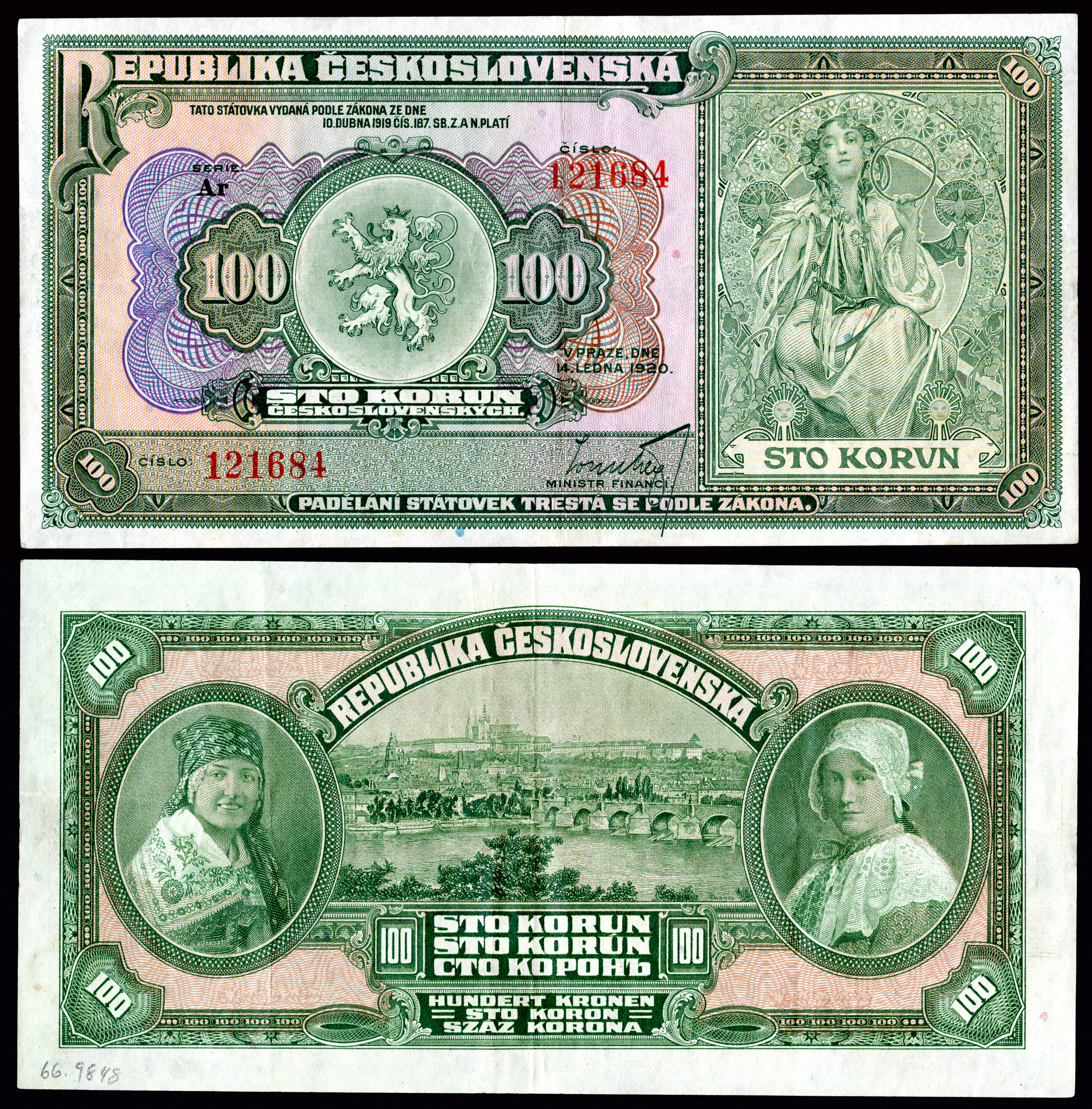
Mucha-designed artwork on a 100 Czechoslovak Republic koruna note (1920)

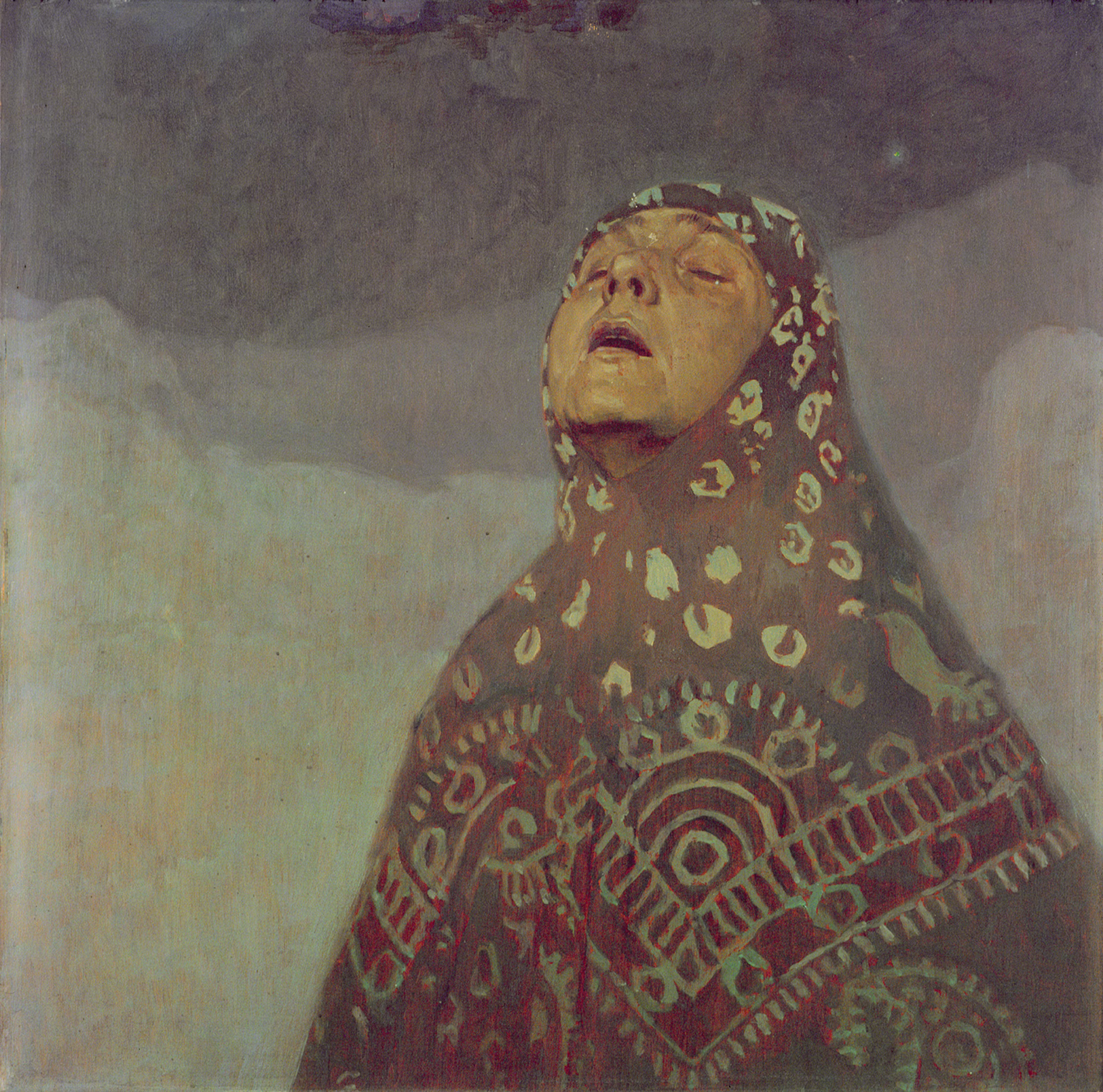
Woman in the Wilderness, detail depicting a Russian peasant dying during a famine (1923)

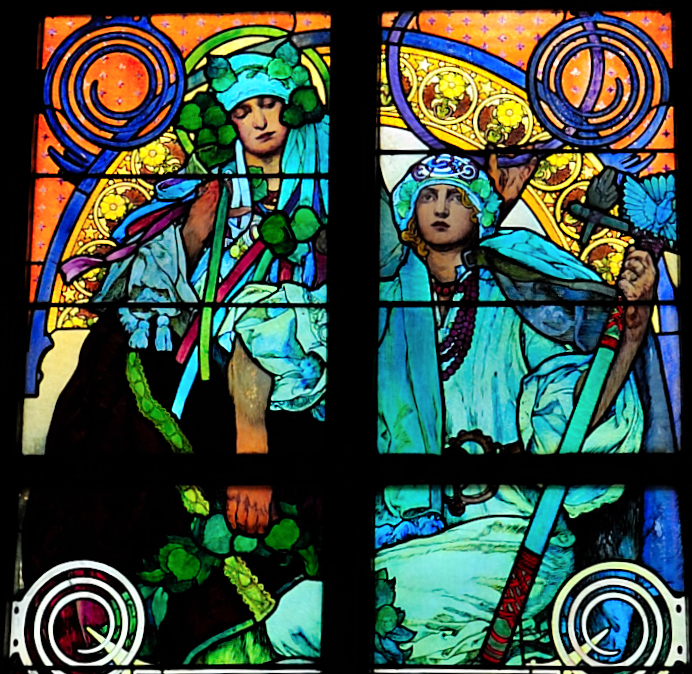
Stained glass window for Saint Vitus Cathedral, Prague (1931)

The Lord Mayor's Hall was finished in 1911, and Mucha was able to devote his attention to what he considered his most important work; The Slav Epic, a series of large paintings illustrating the achievements of the Slavic peoples over history. The series had twenty paintings, half devoted to the history of the Czechs, and ten to other Slavic peoples (Russians, Poles, Serbs, Hungarians, Bulgarians, and the Balkans, including the Orthodox monasteries of Mount Athos). The canvases were enormous; the finished works measured six by eight metres. To paint them he rented an apartment and a studio in the Zbiroh Castle in western Bohemia, where he lived and worked until 1928.

While living in Paris, Mucha had imagined the series as "light shining into the souls of all people with its clear ideals and burning warnings." To prepare the project he travelled to all the Slavic countries, from Russia and Poland to the Balkans, making sketches and taking photographs. He used costumed models and still and motion picture cameras to set the scenes, often encouraging the models to create their own poses. He used egg tempera paint, which, according to his research, was quicker-drying and more luminous, and would last longer.

He created the twenty canvases between 1912 and 1926. He worked throughout the First World War, when the Austrian Empire was at war with France, despite wartime restrictions, which made canvas hard to obtain. He continued his work after the war ended, when the new Czechoslovak Republic was created. The cycle was completed in 1928 in time for the tenth anniversary of the proclamation of the Czechoslovak Republic.

Under the conditions of his contract he donated his work to the city of Prague in 1928. The Slav Epic was shown in Prague twice in his lifetime, in 1919 and 1928. After 1928 it was rolled up and put into storage.

From 1963 until 2012 the series was on display in the chateau in Moravský Krumlov in the South Moravian Region in the Czech Republic. In 2012 the series was put on display at the National Gallery Prague's Trade Fair Palace. In 2021 it was announced that a new, permanent home would be found for the paintings in central Prague, to be completed in 2026. In 2025, it was decided the loan to Moravský Krumlov would be extended for five years until 2031.

While he was working on The Slav Epic, he also did work for the Czech government. In 1918, he designed the Czechoslovak koruna bank note, with the image of Slavia, the daughter of his U.S. patron Charles Crane. He also designed postage stamps for his new country. He declined commercial work, but did make occasional posters for philanthropic and cultural events, such as the Lottery of the Union of Southwestern Moravia, and for Prague cultural events.

Making of The Slav Epic

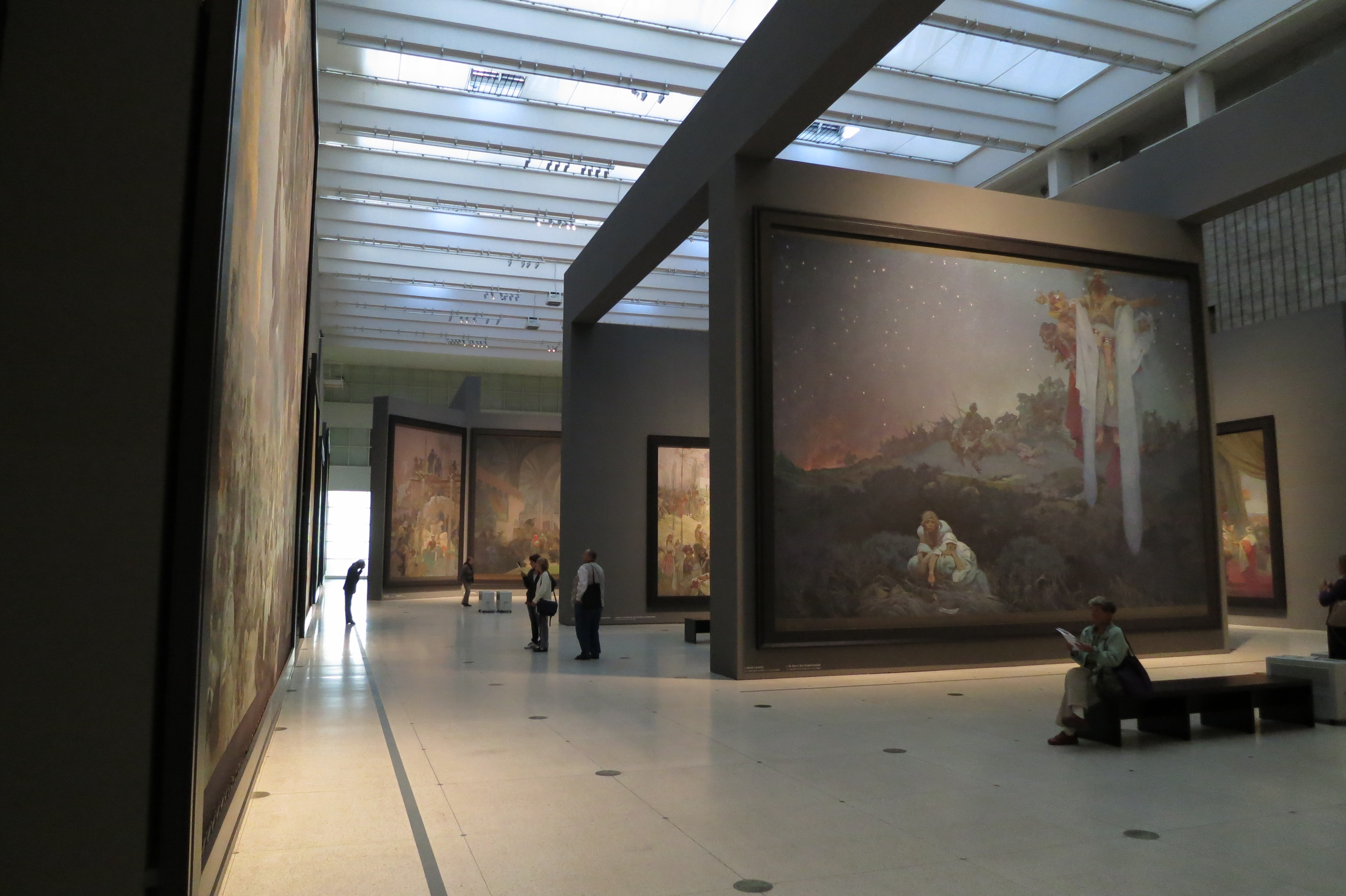
The Slav Epic as it appeared in the National Gallery of Prague

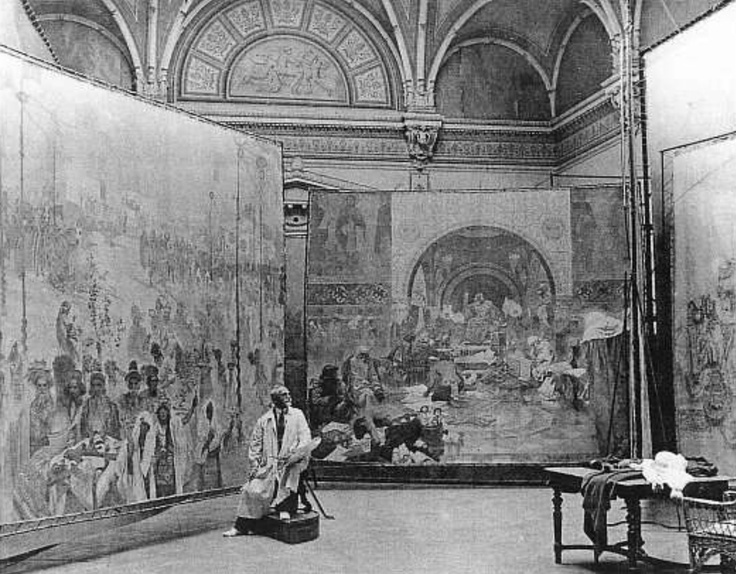
Mucha at work on The Slav Epic (1920s)

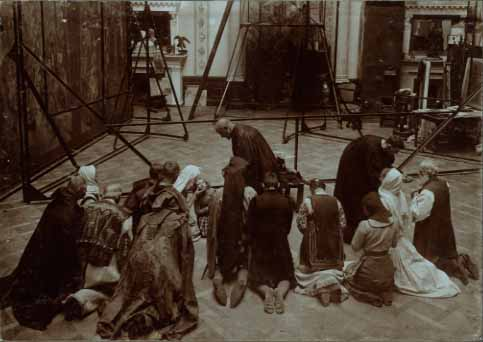
Photographic study for The Meeting at Krǐžky (1914/'15), probably collodion
The Slav Epic cycles in order

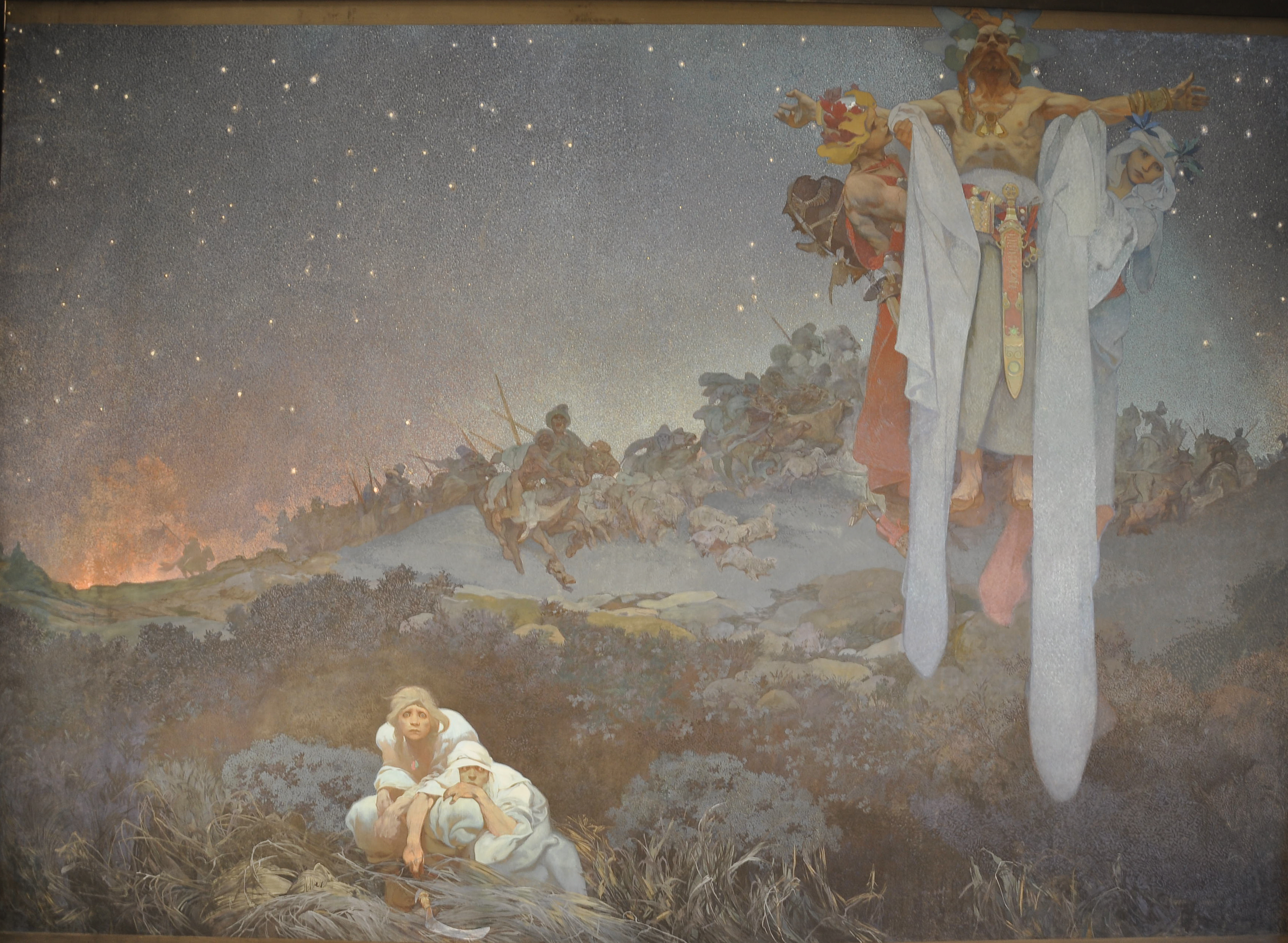
No.1: The Slavs in Their Original Homeland (1912)

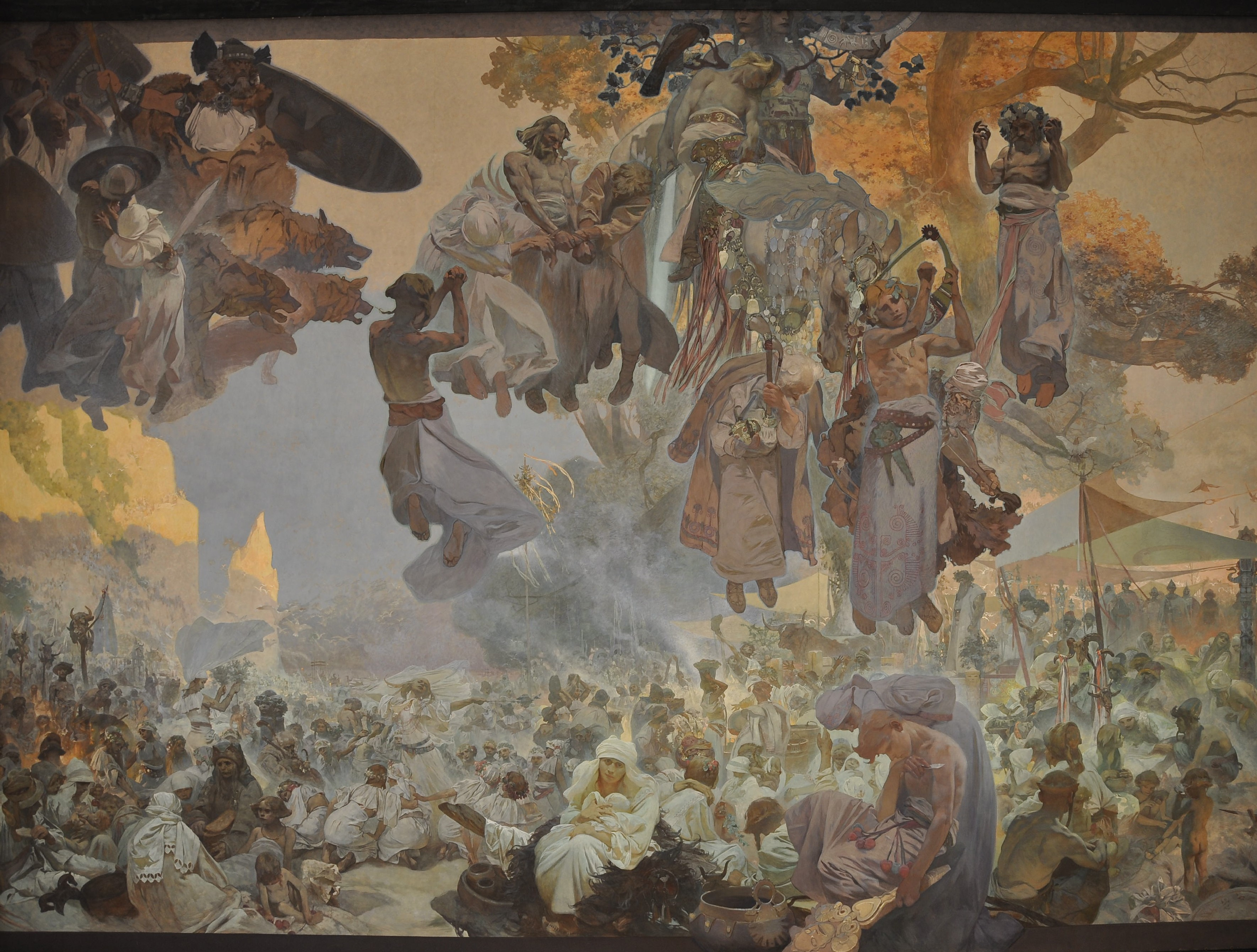
No.2: The Celebration of Svantovít (1912)

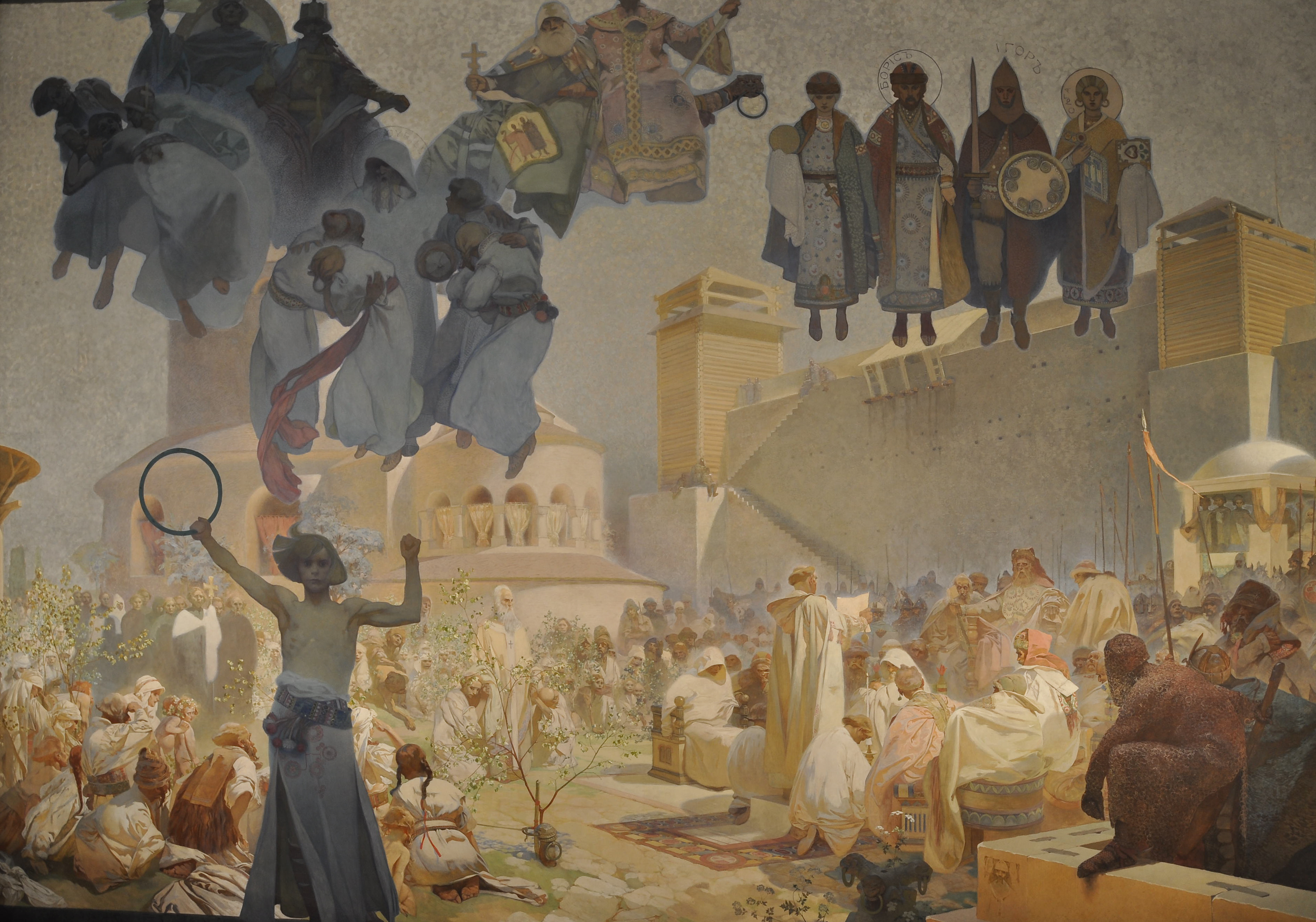
No.3: Introduction of the Slavonic Liturgy in Great Moravia (1912)

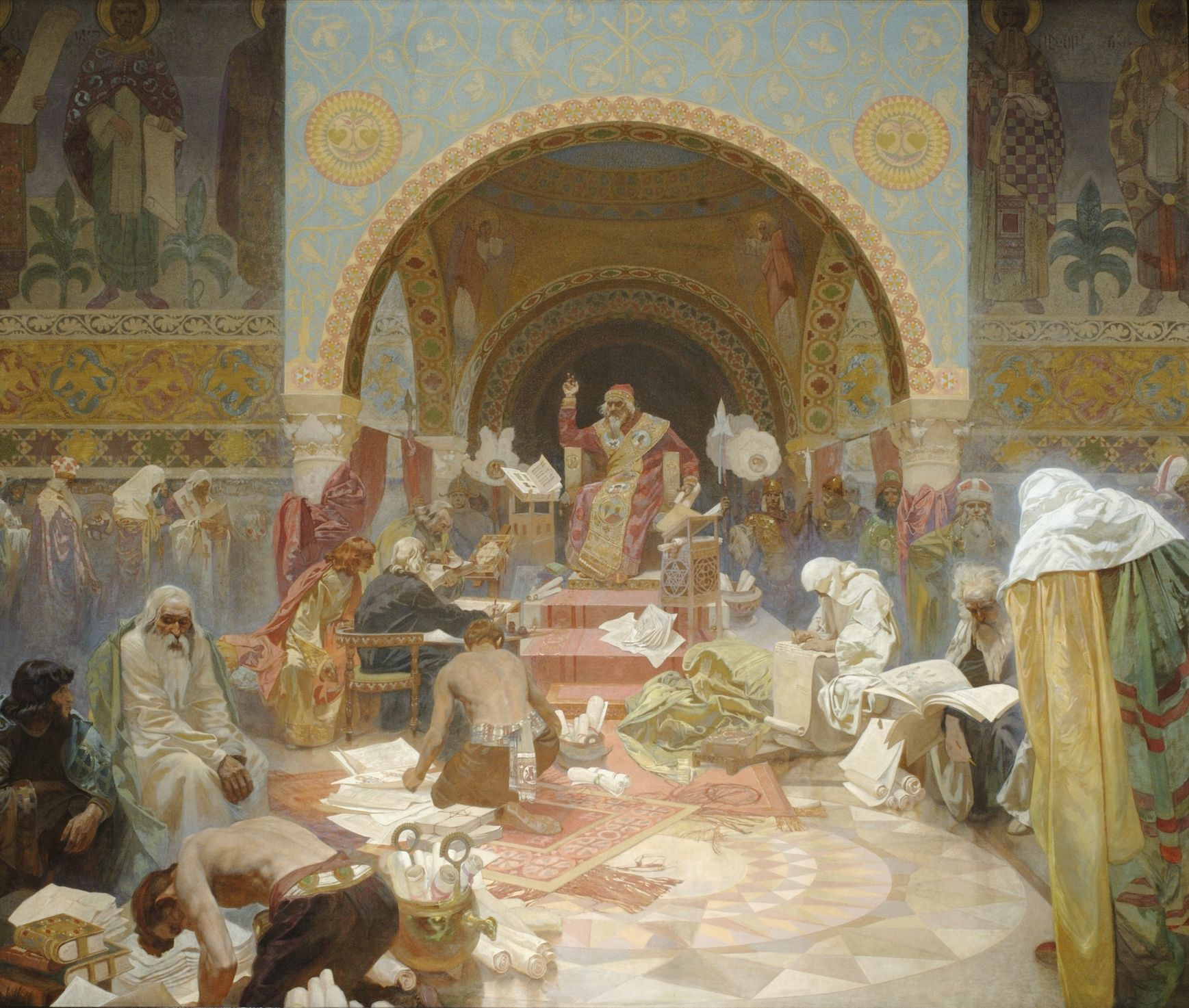
No.4: Tsar Simeon I of Bulgaria (1923)

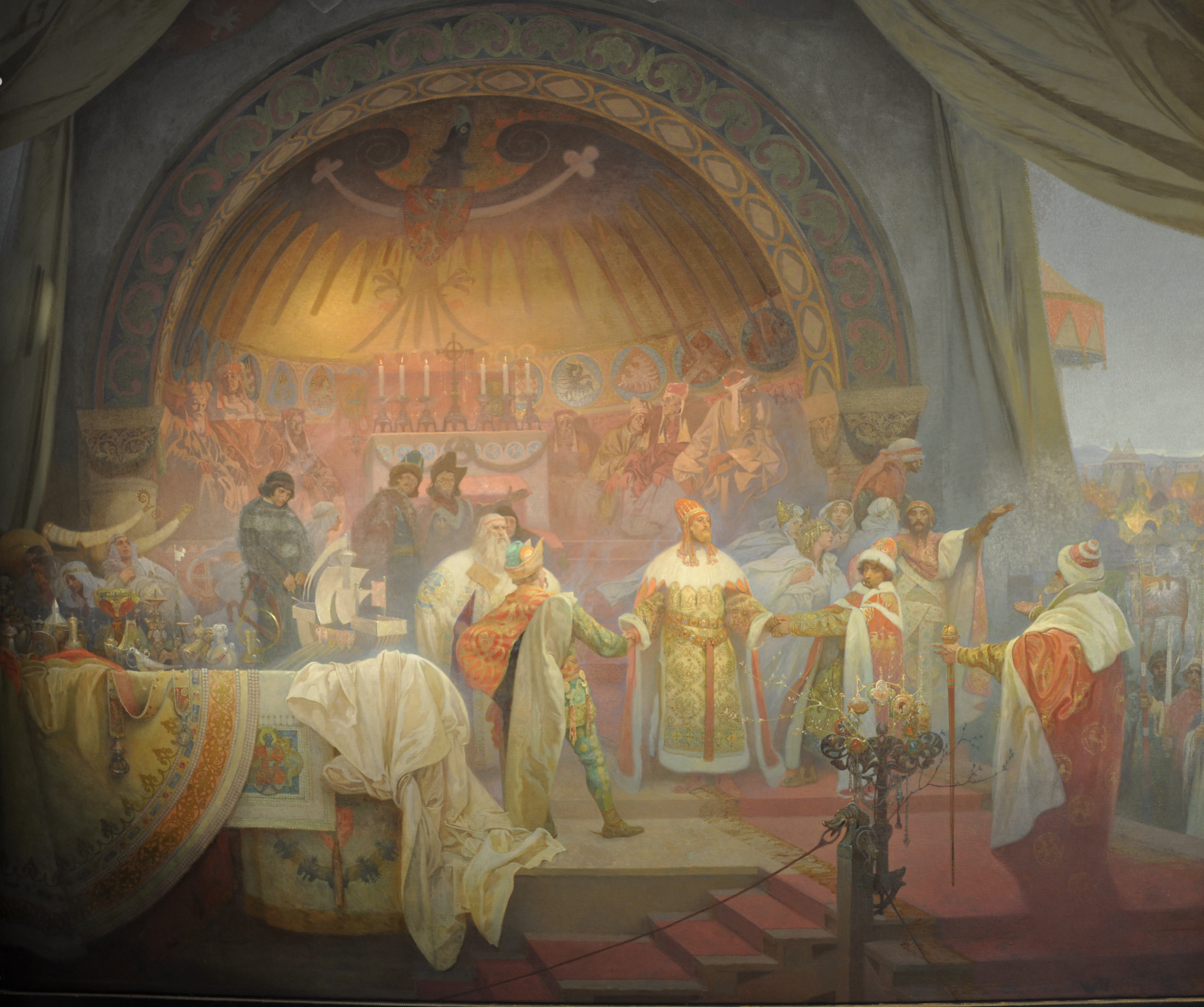
No.5: King Přemysl Otakar II of Bohemia (1924)

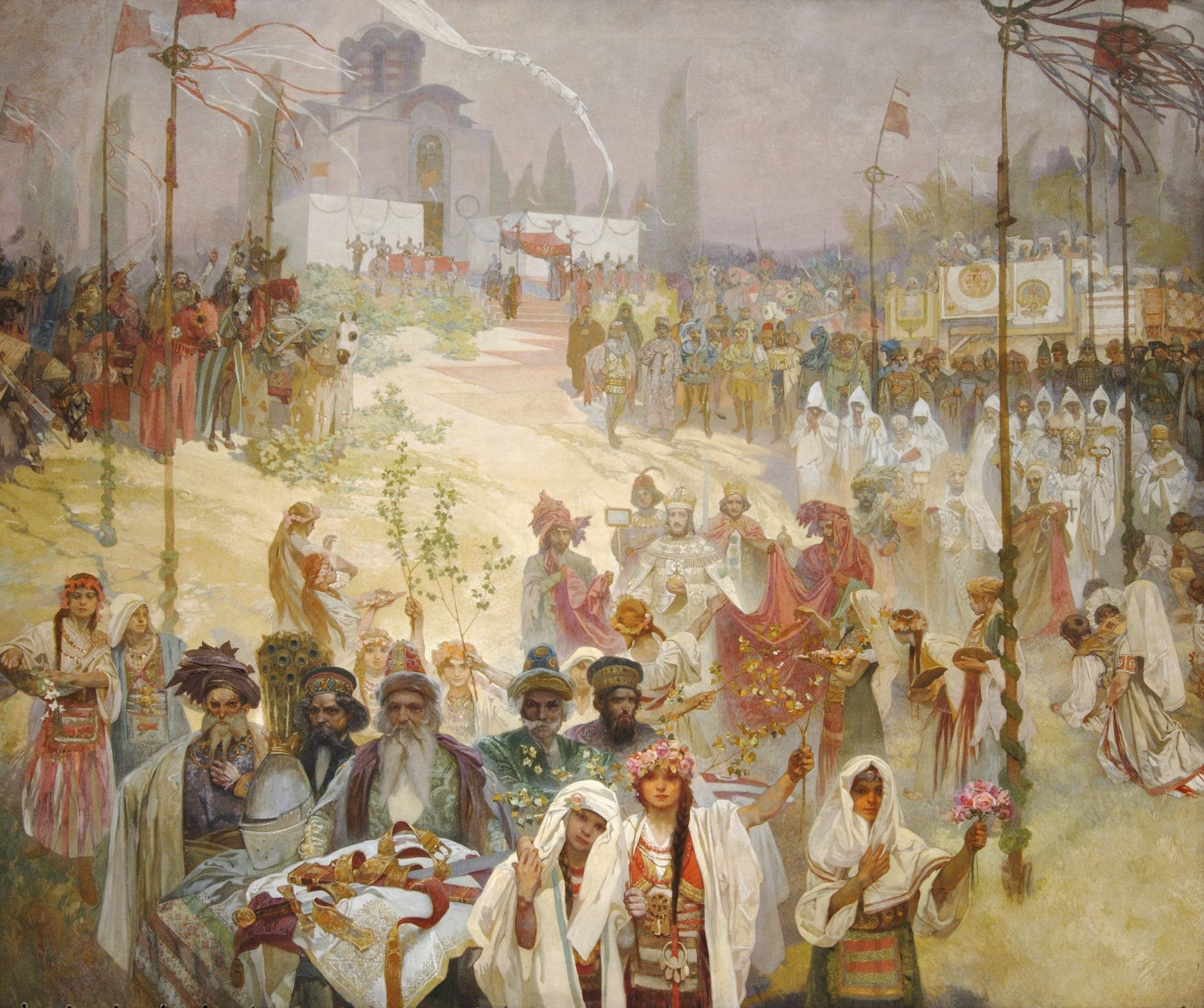
No.6: The Coronation of Serbian Tsar Štěpán Dušan (1926)

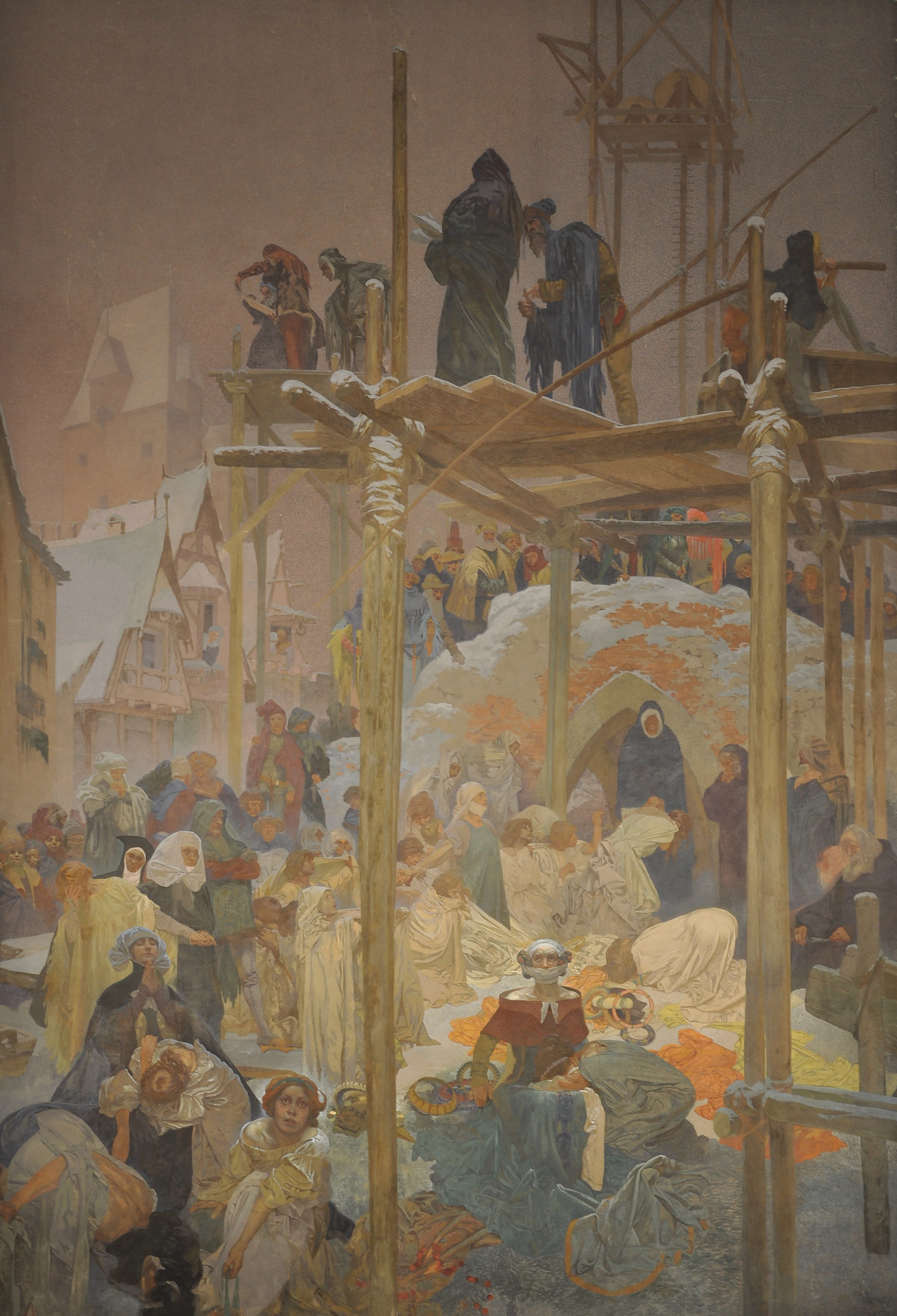
No.7: Milíč of Kroměříž (1916)

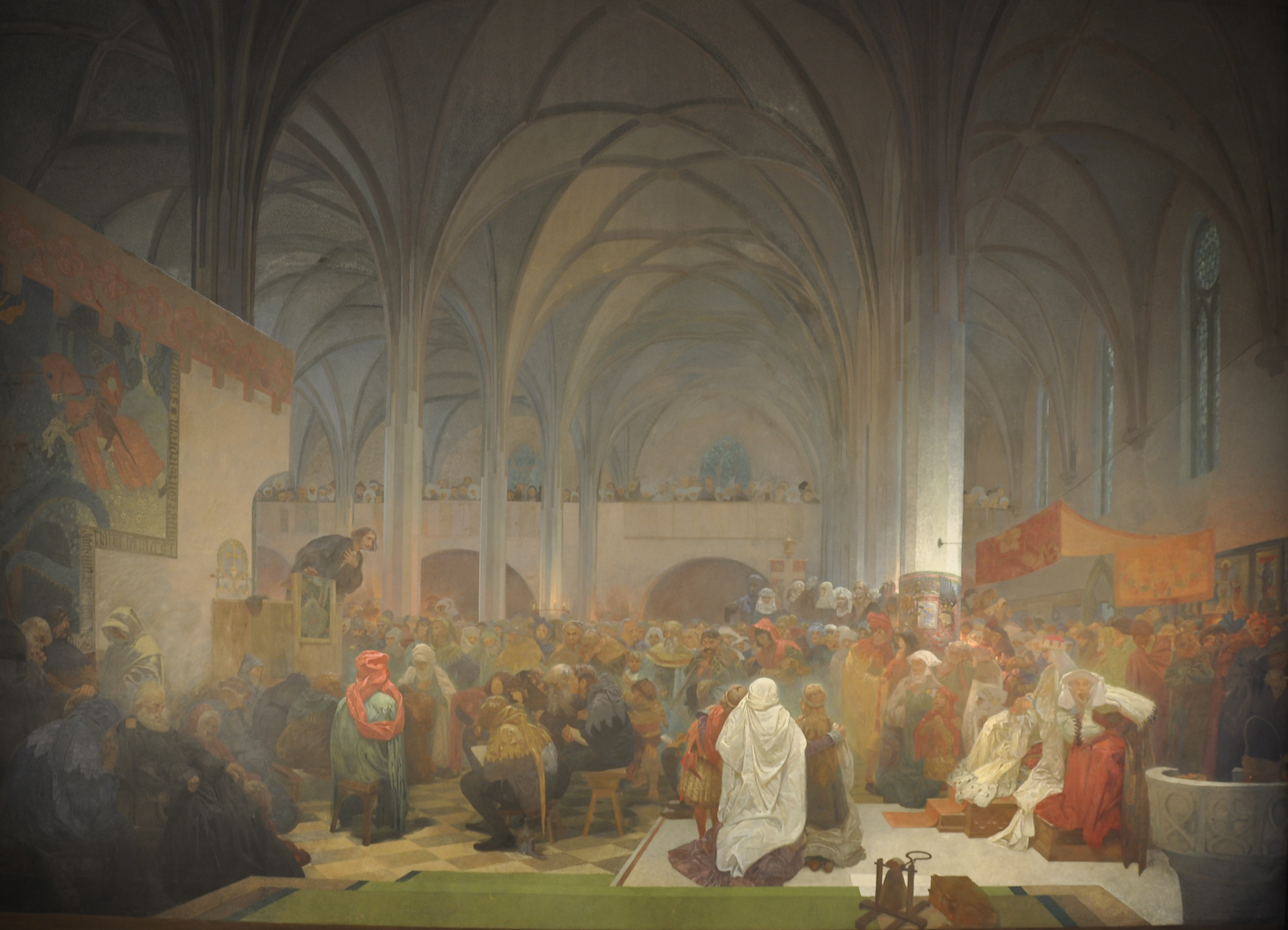
No.8: Master Jan Hus Preaching at the Bethlehem Chapel: Truth Prevails (1916)

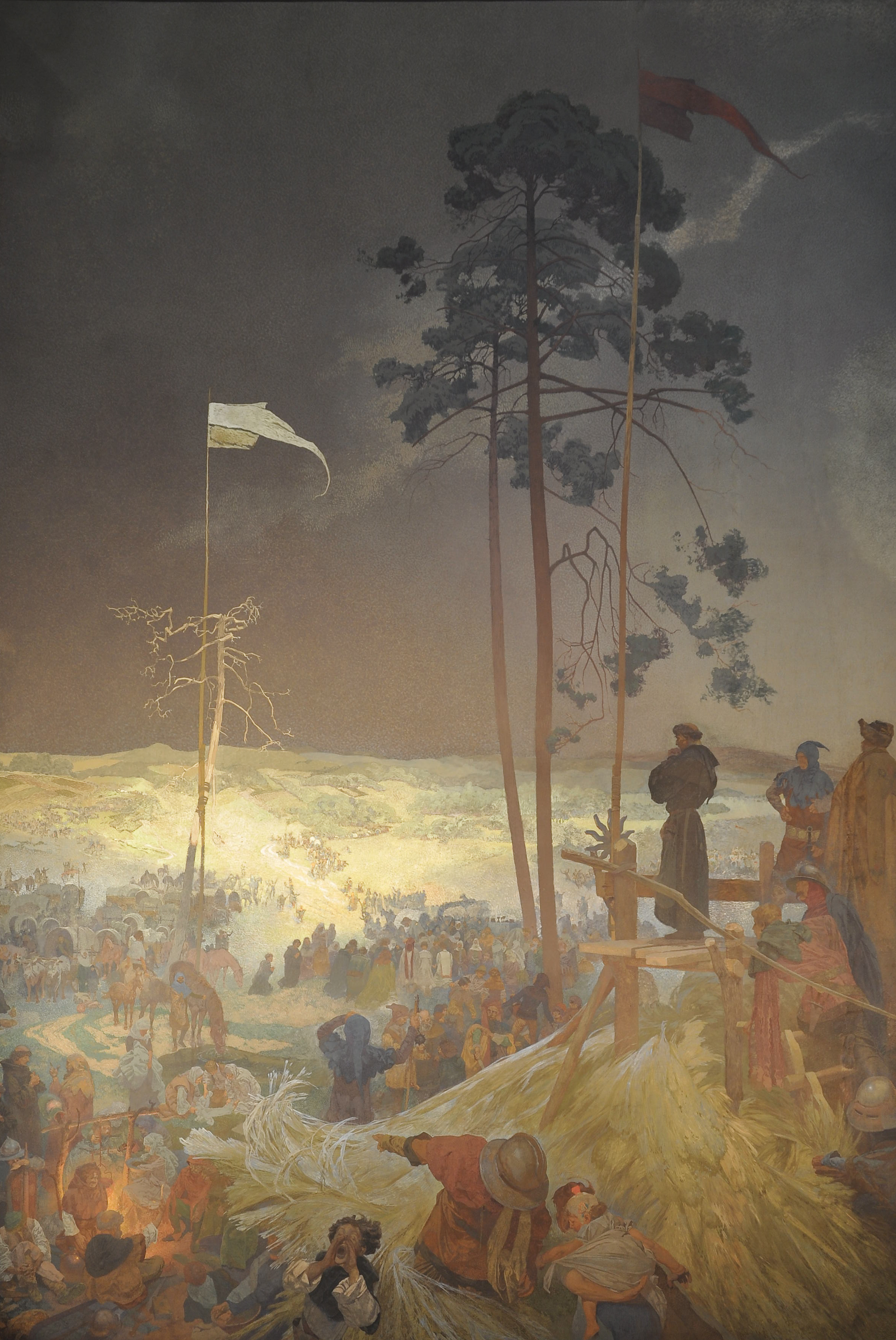
No.9: The Meeting at Křížky (1916)

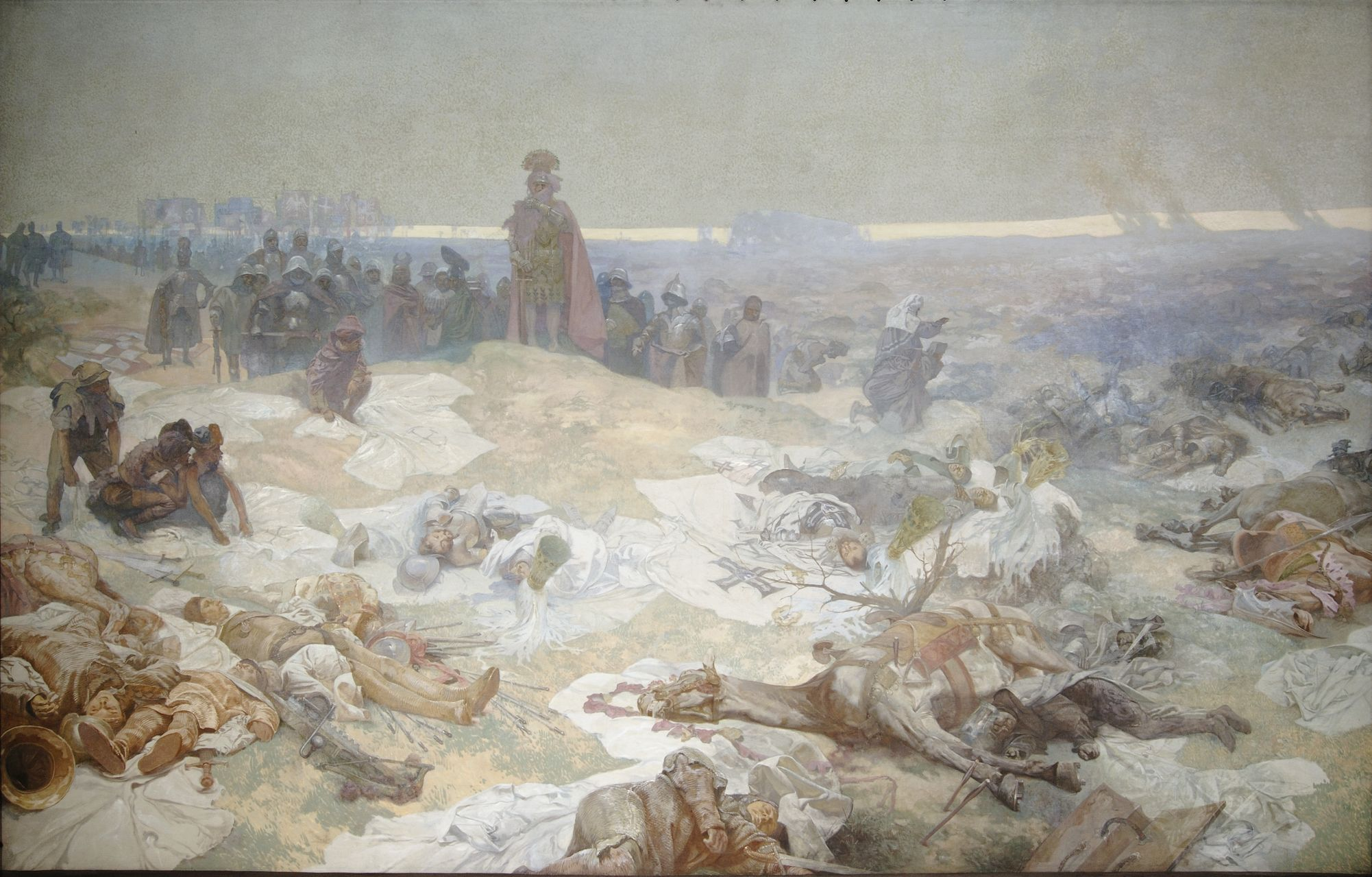
No.10: After the Battle of Grunewald (1924)

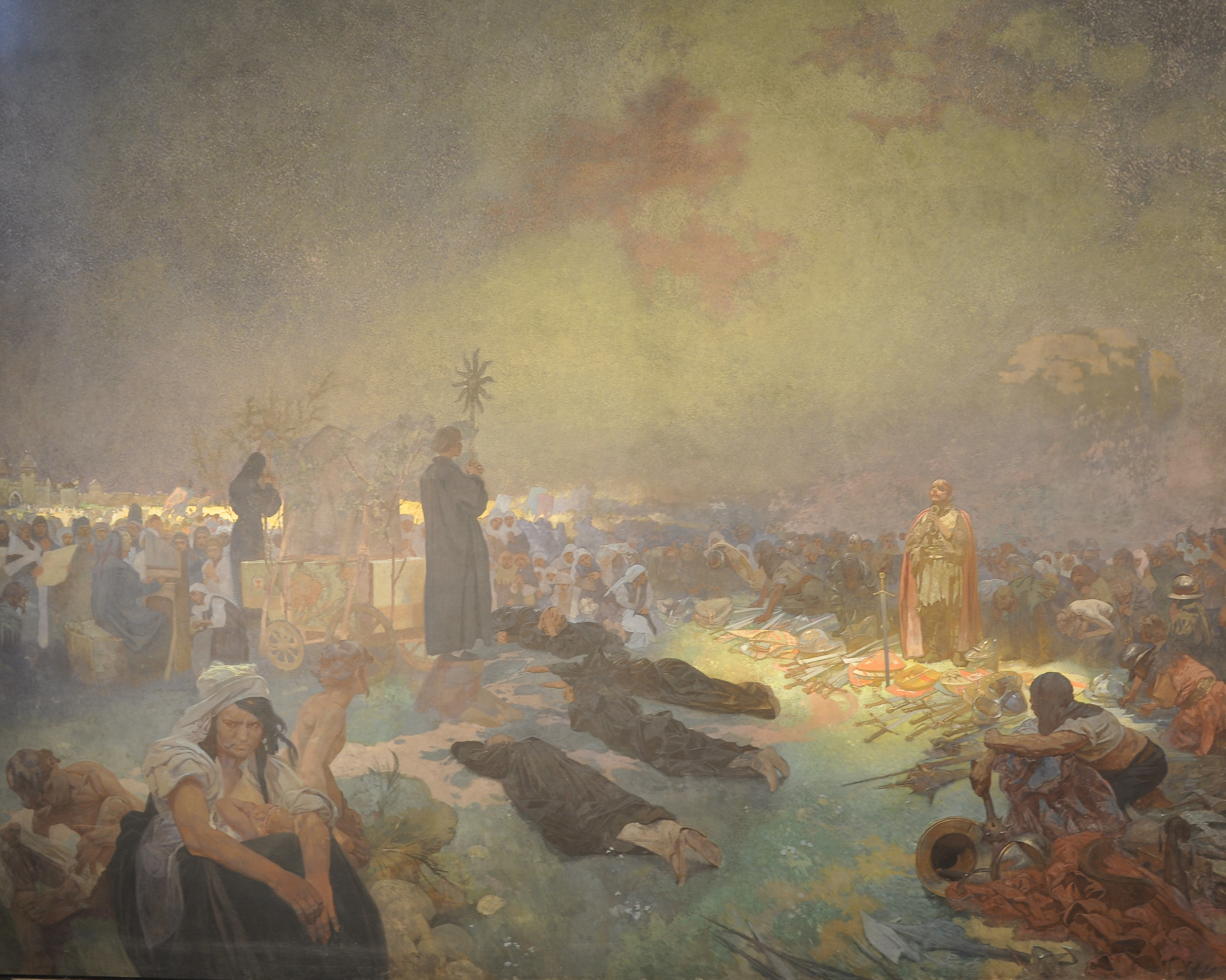
No.11: After the Battle of Vítkov (1916)

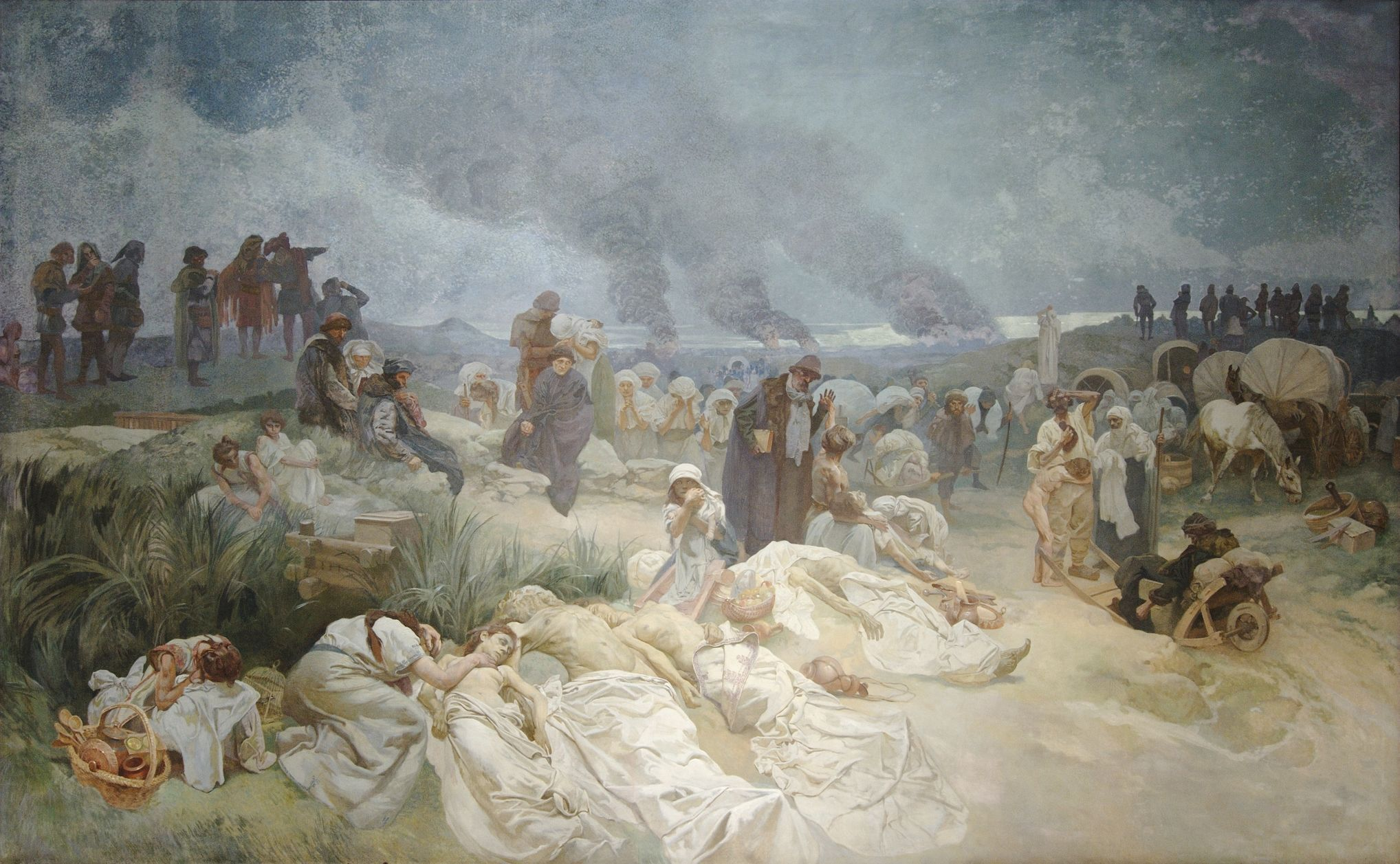
No.12: Petr of Chelčice (1918)

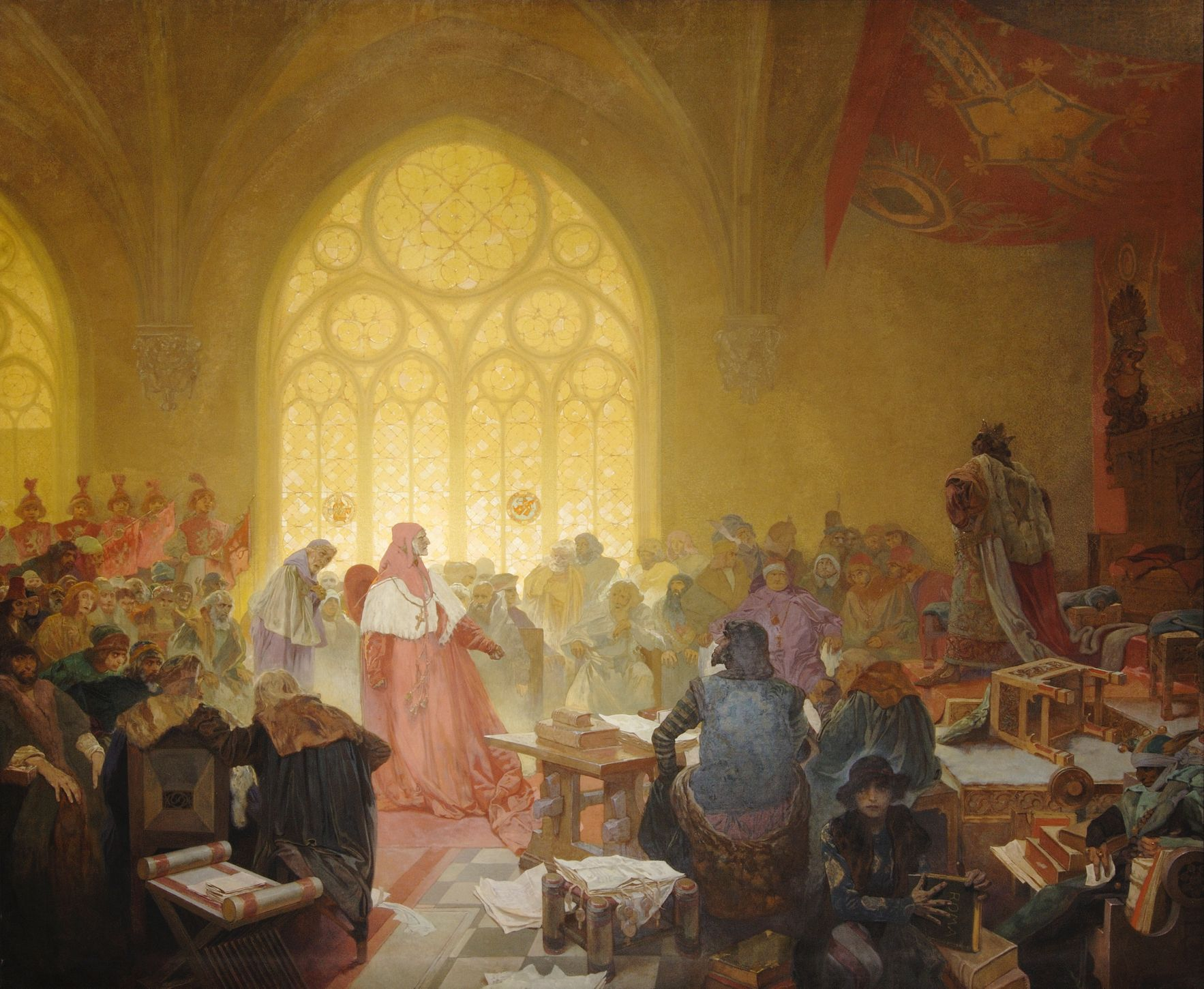
No.13: The Hussite King Jiří z Podĕbrad (1923)

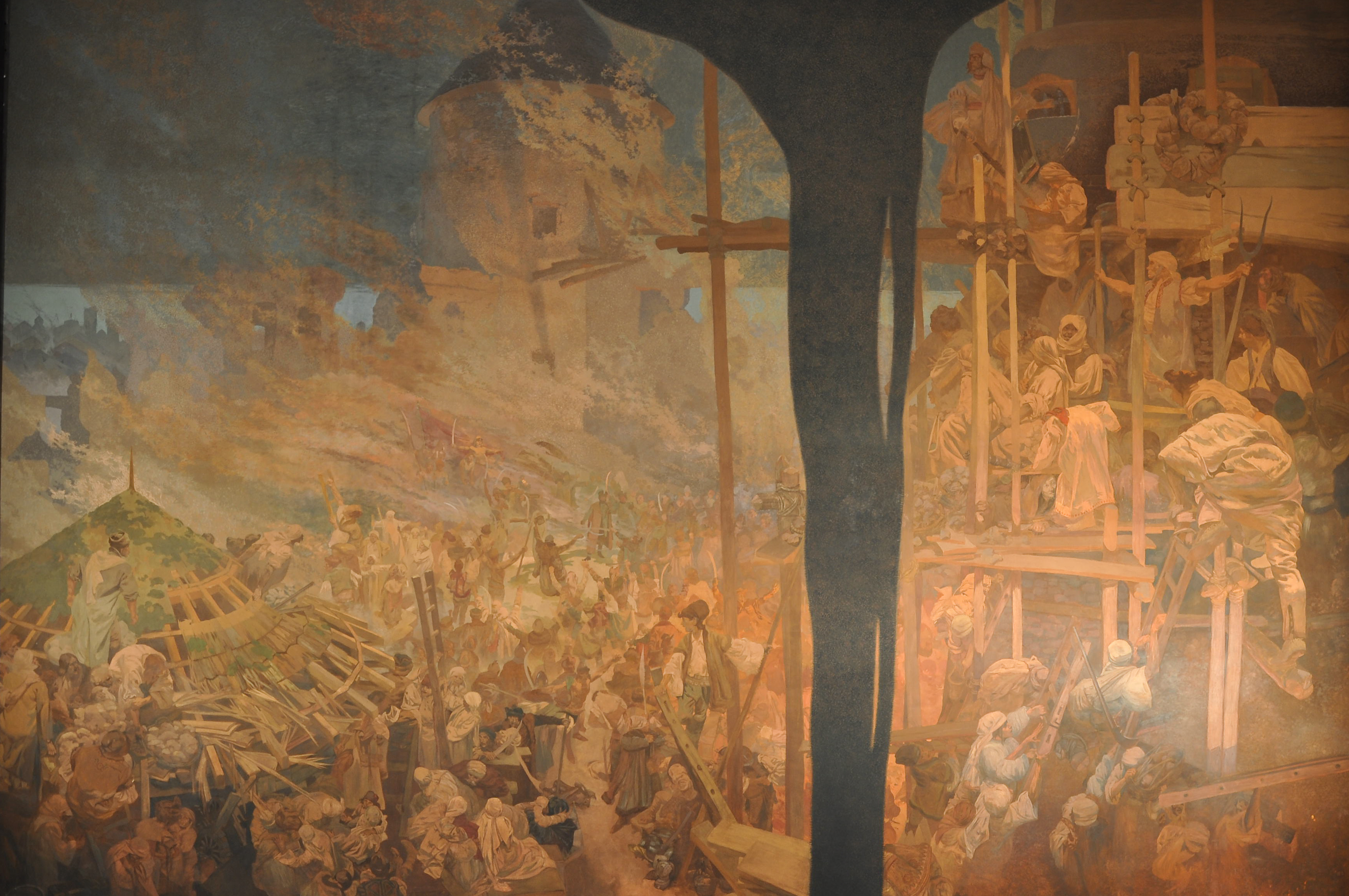
No.14: Defense of Sziget against the Turks by Nicholas Zrinsky (1914)

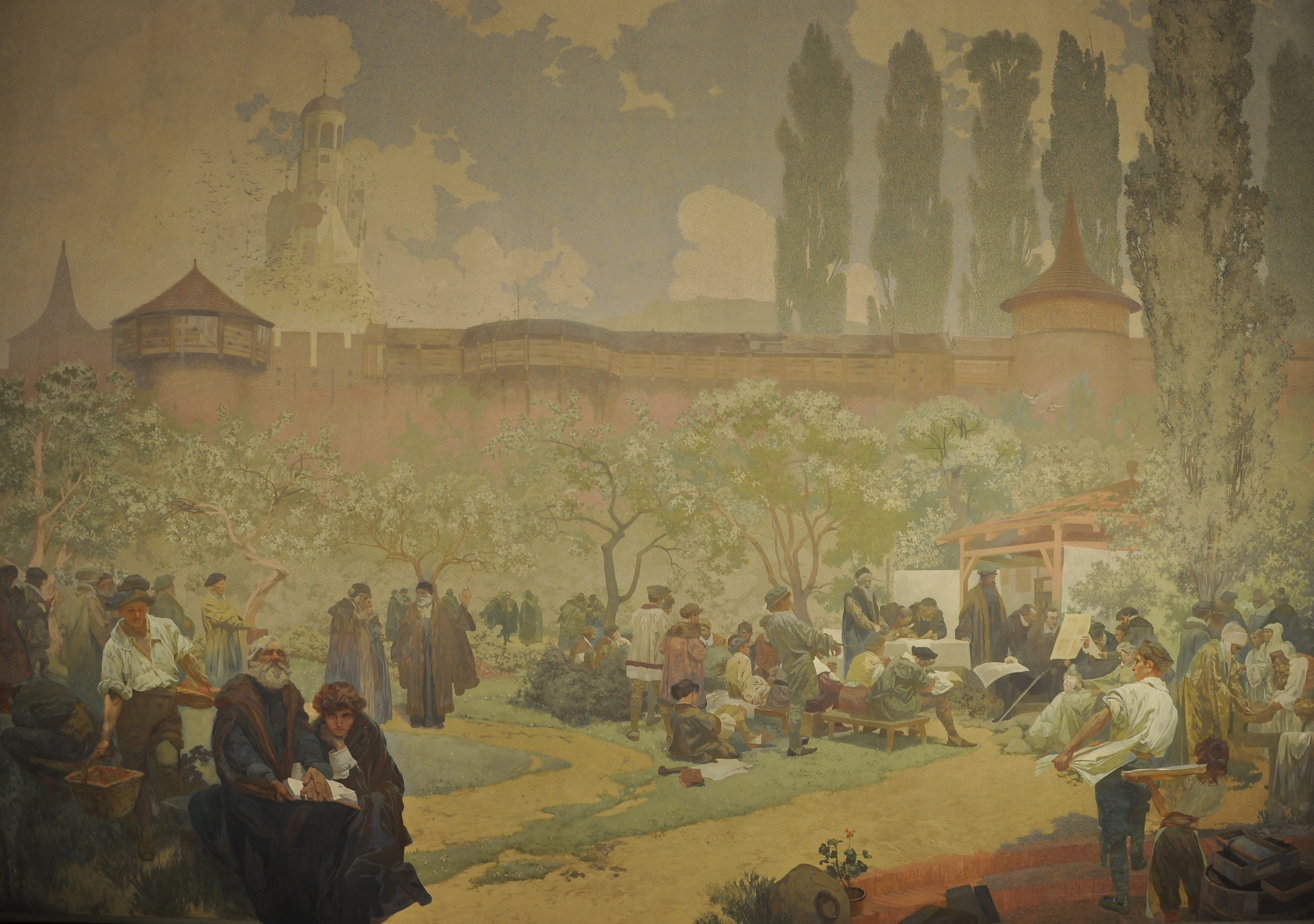
No.15: The Printing of the Bible of Kralice in Ivančice (1914)

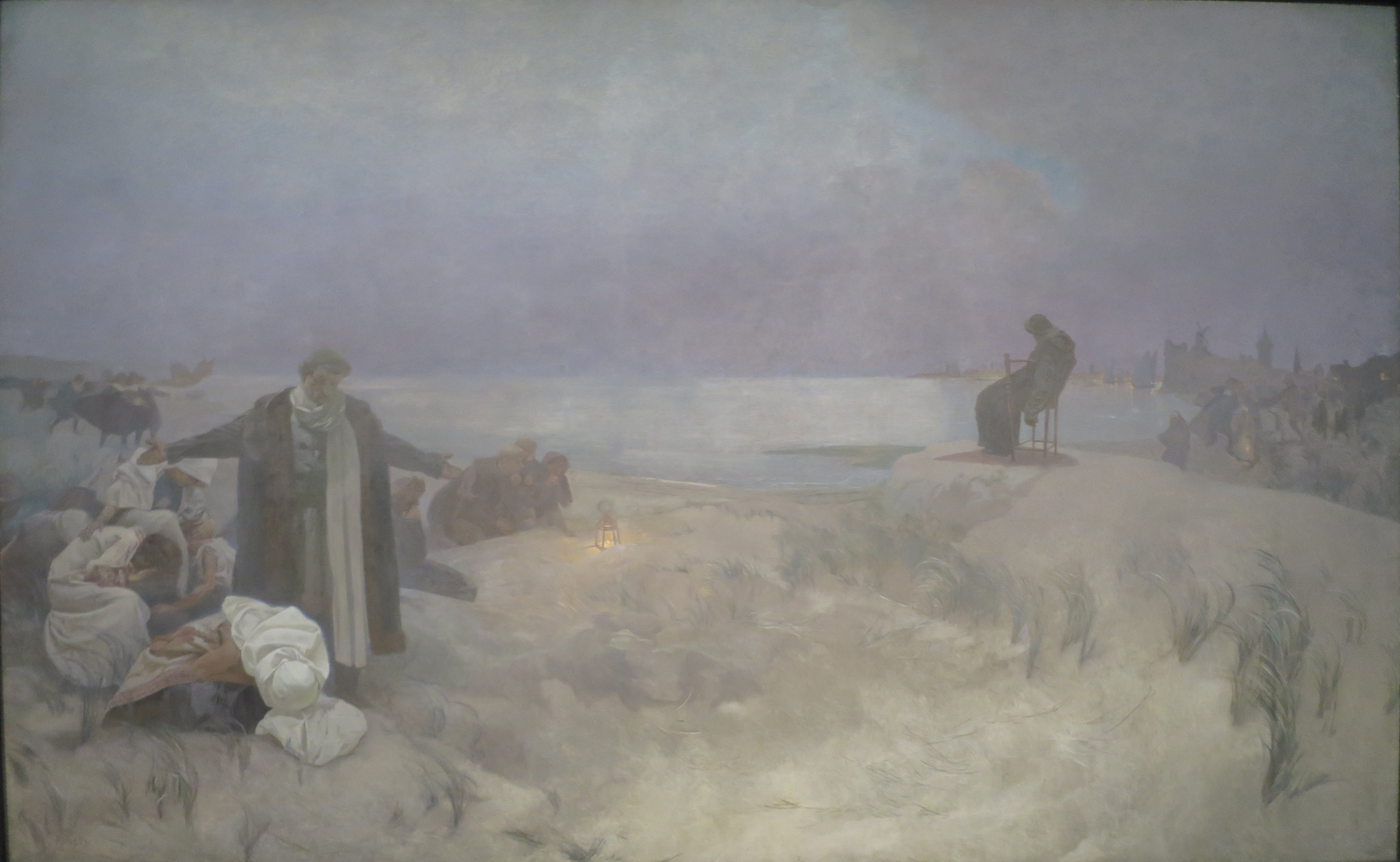
No.16: Jan Amos Komenský (1918)

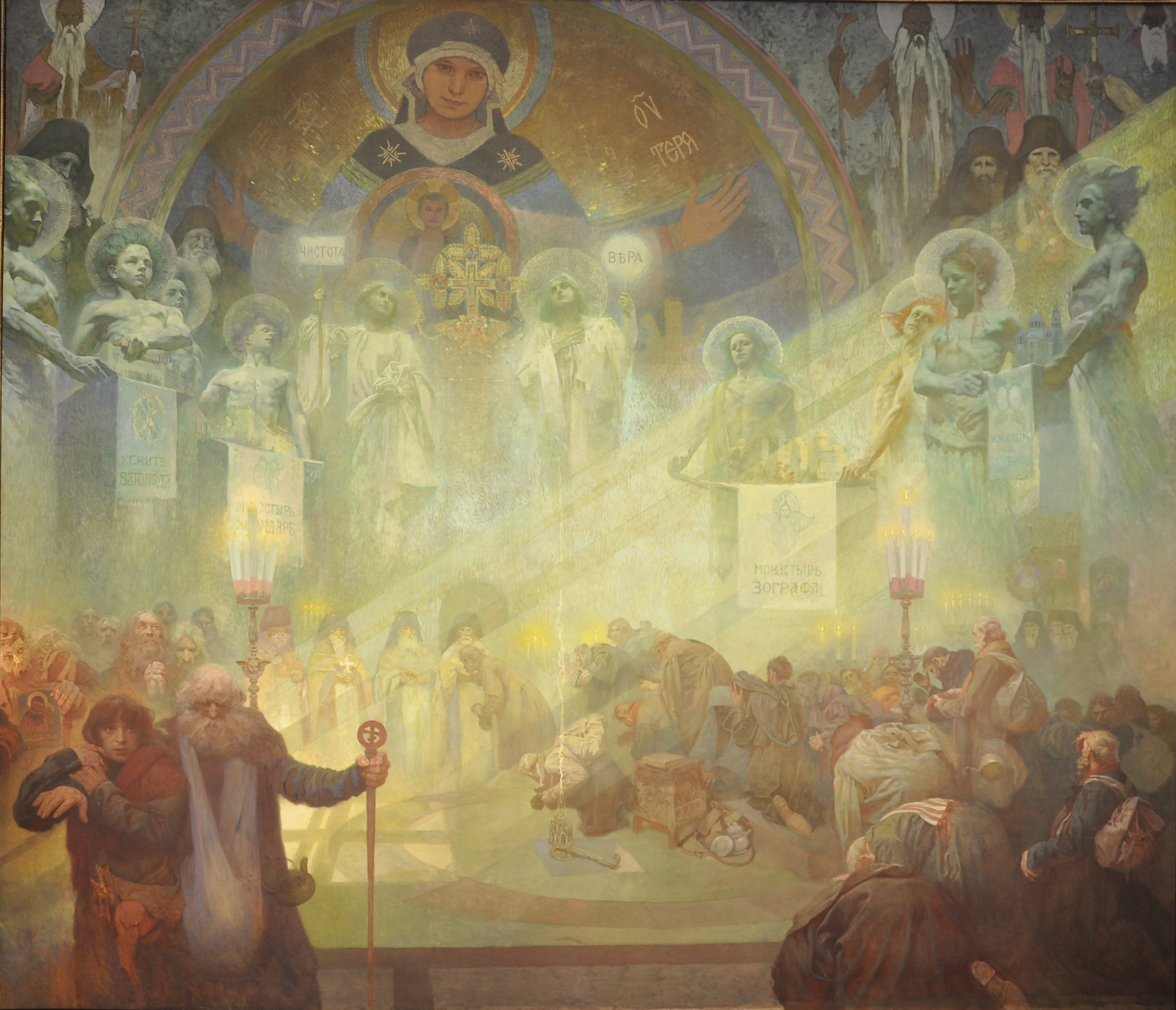
No.17: The Holy Mount Athos (1926)

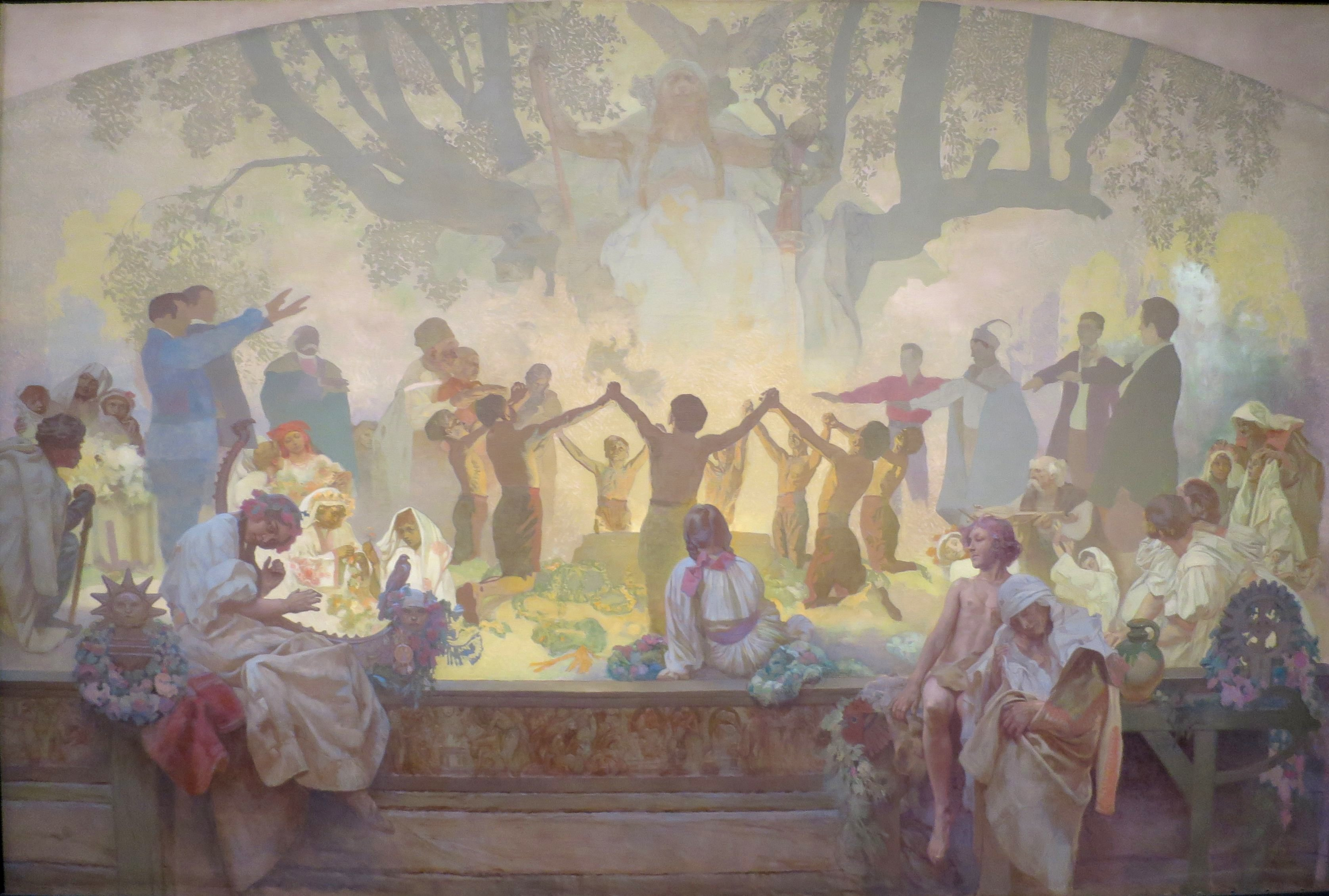
No.18: The Oath of Omladina under the Slavic Linden Tree (1926)

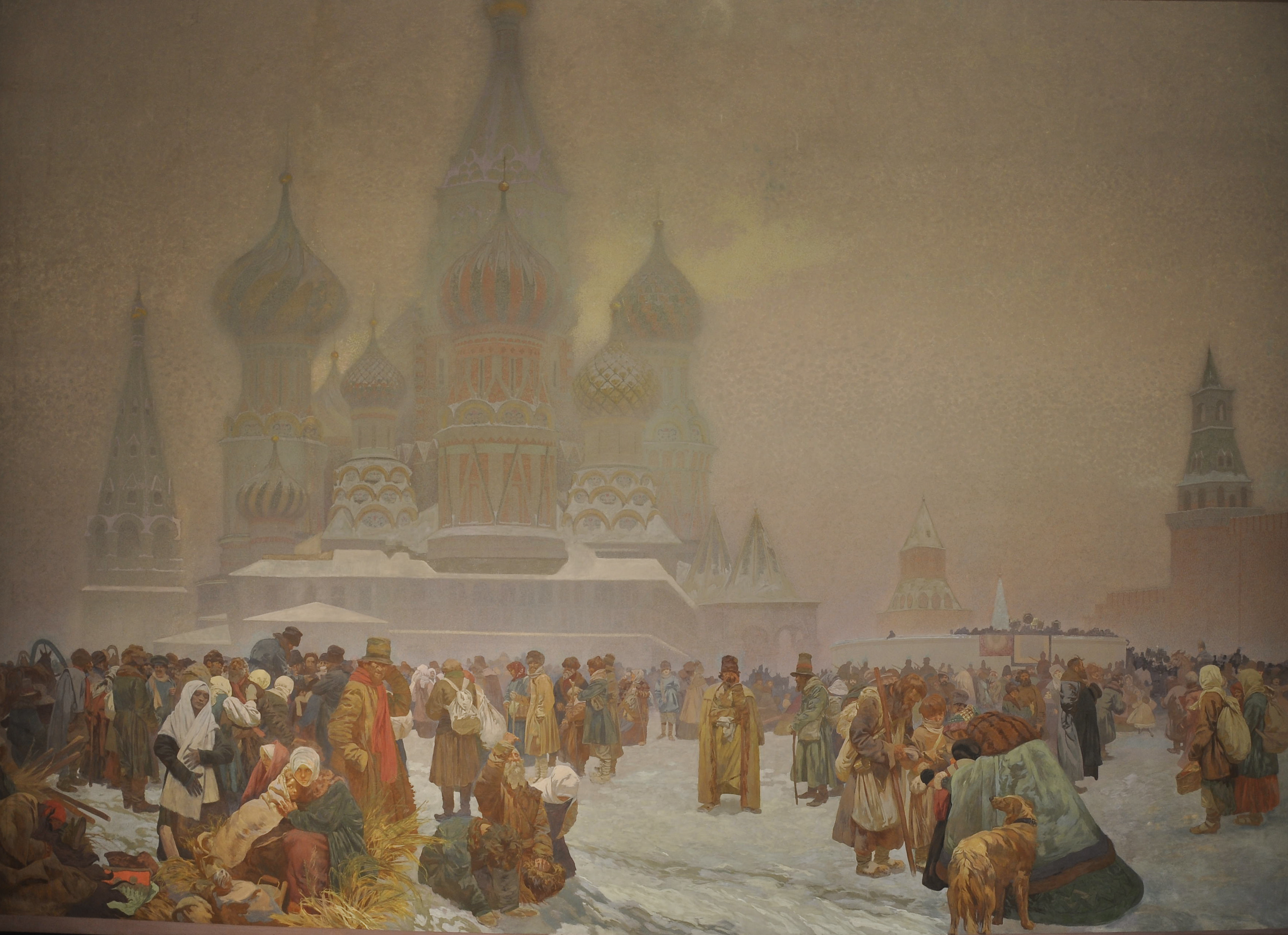
No.19: The Abolition of Serfdom in Russia (1914)

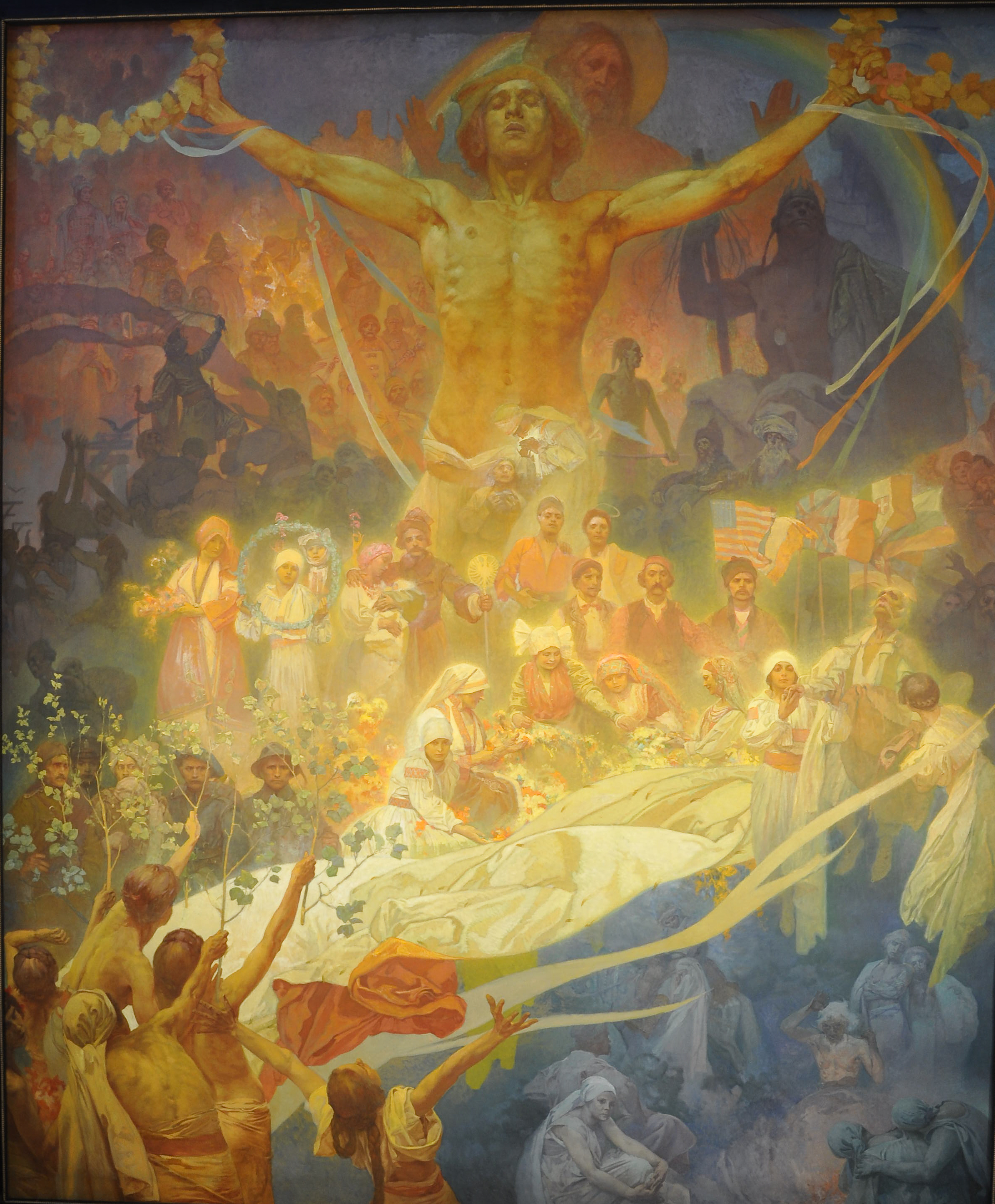
No.20: The Apotheosis of the Slavs, Slavs for Humanity (1926)

== End of life ==
In the political turmoil of the 1930s, Mucha's work received little attention in Czechoslovakia. However, in 1936 a major retrospective was held in Paris at the Jeu de Paume (museum), with 139 works, including three canvases from The Slav Epic.

Adolf Hitler and Nazi Germany began to threaten Czechoslovakia in the 1930s. Mucha began work on a new series, a triptych depicting the Age of Reason, the Age of Wisdom and the Age of Love, which he worked on from 1936 to 1938, but never completed. On 15 March 1939, the German army paraded through Prague, and Hitler, at Prague Castle, declared lands of the former Czechoslovakia to be part of the Greater Germanic Reich as the Protectorate of Bohemia and Moravia. Mucha's role as a Slav nationalist and Freemason made him a prime target. He was arrested, interrogated for several days, and released. By then his health was broken. He contracted pneumonia and died on 14 July 1939, 10 days short of his 79th birthday and over a month before the outbreak of World War II. Though public gatherings were banned, a huge crowd attended his interment in the Slavín Monument of Vyšehrad Cemetery, reserved for notable figures in Czech culture.

== Legacy ==
Mucha was and remains widely known for his Art Nouveau work, which frustrated him. According to his son and biographer, Jiří Mucha, he did not think much of Art Nouveau. "What is it, Art Nouveau?" he asked. "...Art can never be new." He took the greatest pride in his work as a history painter.

Although it enjoys great popularity today, at the time of his death Mucha's style was considered outdated. His son Jiří devoted much of his life to writing about him and bringing attention to his artwork. In his own country, the new authorities were not interested in Mucha. The Slav Epic was rolled and stored for twenty-five years before being shown in Moravský Krumlov. The National Gallery in Prague now displays The Slav Epic, and has a major collection of Mucha's work.

The Mucha Museum, located in Prague's Kounice and Savarin Palaces, is the only museum dedicated to the artist, and opened in 1998.

One of the largest collections of Mucha's works is that of Czech nine-year World Champion tennis player Ivan Lendl, who started collecting his works upon meeting Jiří Mucha in 1982. His collection was exhibited publicly for the first time in 2013 in Prague.

Mucha is also credited with restoring the movement of Czech Freemasonry.

== See also ==
- Art Nouveau posters and graphic arts
- List of works by Alphonse Mucha
- Les Maîtres de l'Affiche
- Salon des Cent

== Bibliography ==
- Rogasch, Wilfried, ed. (2020). Alfons Mucha. The Great Masters of Art. Munich: Hirmer Publishers. ISBN 978-3-7774-3488-9. OCLC 1129022058.
- Sato, Tomoko (2015). Alphonse Mucha: The Artist as Visionary. Cologne: Taschen. ISBN 978-3-8365-5009-3.
- Sato, Tomoko (2025). Timeless Mucha: The Magic of Line. Mucha Foundation. ISBN 978-1-636-81399-8
- Thiébaut, Philippe (2018). Mucha et l'Art Nouveau (in French). Paris: Éditions du Chêne. ISBN 978-2-81231-806-1.
- Tierchant, Hélène (2009). Sarah Bernhardt- Madame Quand même (in French). Paris: SW Télémaque. ISBN 978-2-7533-0092-7.
