= David Ossipovitch Widhopff =

Ukrainian-born French painter

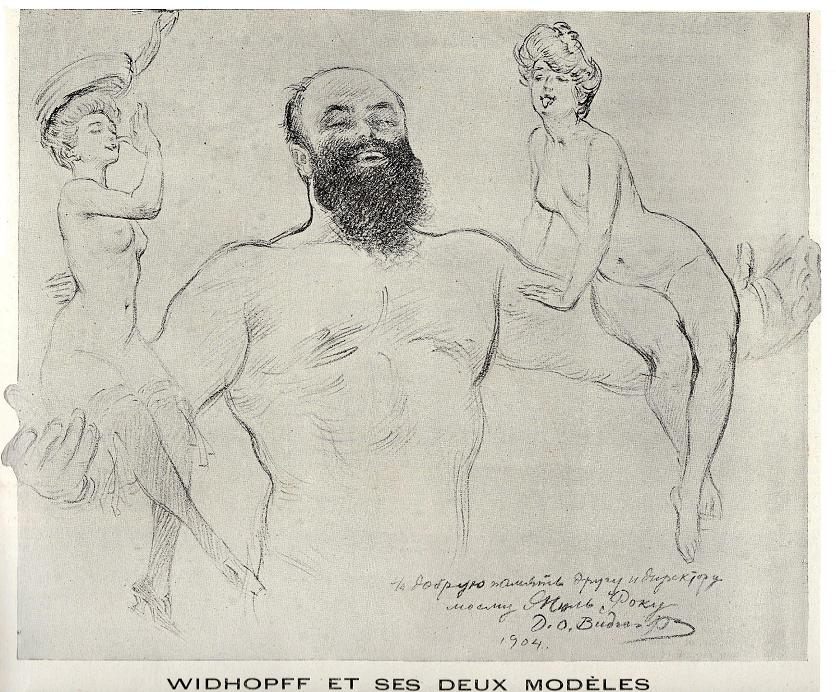
- Self portrait, 1904
- Born: 5 May 1867; Odesa, Ukraine
- Died: 20 July 1933 (aged 66); Saint-Clair-sur-Epte, France
- Education: Odesa Art School of Drawing, Académie Julian

Signature
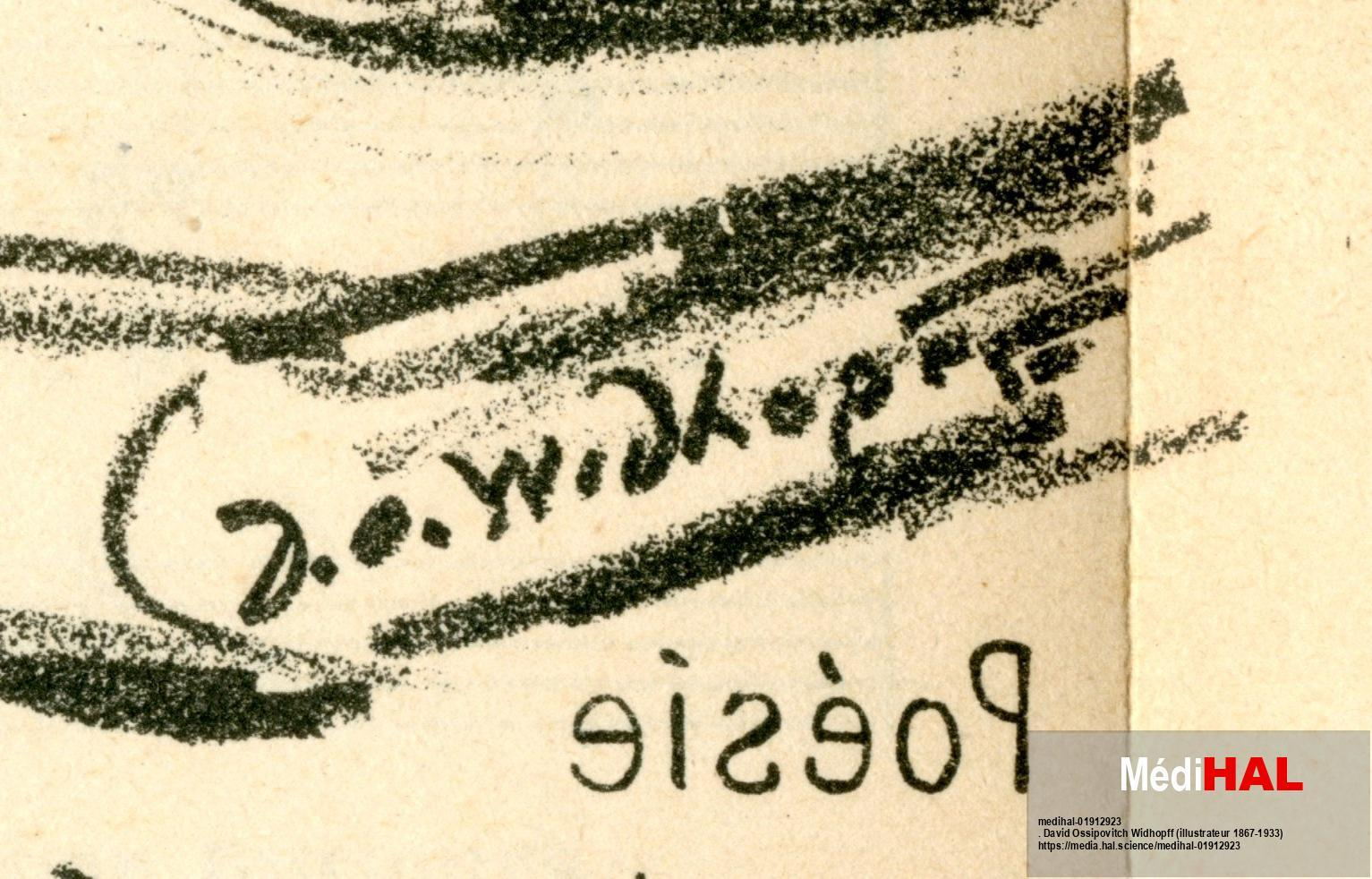

David Ossipovitch Widhopff (Ukrainian: Давід Осипович Відгоф; 1867–1933) was a Ukrainian painter, caricaturist and poster artist. A naturalized citizen of France, Widhopff was active in the Paris art scene for more than four decades, counting Czech artist Alfons Mucha and French writer Léon Deschamps among his many friends.

Notable for his skill and virtuosity in several mediums, Widhopff exhibited paintings at the Paris Salons in 1888, 1891 and 1893, earning acclaim from major French critics at Les Temps, L'Eclair, and Le Radical. He followed up by founding a fine-arts academy in the Amazonian state of Pará at the behest of the Brazilian government. He quickly became active in the local art scene, had several one-man shows, acted as artistic director for several newspapers, and illustrated poems and short stories. Upon his return, he created posters for the highly influential art dealer Ambroise Vollard and illustrations for Le Courrier français weekly magazine.

Ten years before he died, artist Chana Orloff created a life-size bronze sculpture of a bearded Widhopff sitting with his legs spread out, smoking a pipe, now owned by the Centre Pompidou.

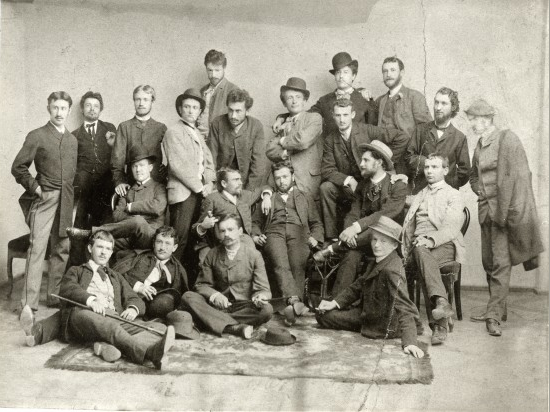
Students in Munich, 1886. Seated: Widhopf (center), Alphonse Mucha (in profile) and Karel Vítězslav Mašek (right). Standing: Luděk Marold and Leonid Pasternak.

== Career ==
In the 1880s, Widhopff earned a diploma at the Odesa Art School of Drawing. Soon after, he moved to Germany, where he became a student of Max Herterich, at the Academy of Fine Arts, Munich. In 1887, he moved to France, and studied under painters Tony Robert-Fleury and Jules Joseph Lefebvre at the Académie Julian in Paris. For the next three years, he worked alongside Maurice Denis and Paul Ranson, and keenly followed the style of academic painter William-Adolphe Bouguereau. He also led other artists from the Russian Empire in a group called the Société des Artistes Russes. In 1888, 1891 and 1893, Widhopff exhibited at the Paris Salons. He traveled to Brazil and was "encouraged by the state of Pará to lead the chairs of painting and drawing in two of the main schools of the elite of Belém: Liceu Paraense (or Lyceu Benjamin Constant) and Escola Normal."

Upon his arrival in 1893, Widhopff made friends with other foreign artists who were there, such as Maurice Blaise, Giuseppe Leone Righini, Domenico de Angelis, Joseph Casse, João Carlos Wiegandt, among others. He starred in exhibitions and conflicts with the Liceu Paraense, acted as artistic director of newspapers such as O Mosquito, Tico-Tico and ZigZag, made illustrations for poems and short stories by Paulino de Brito, for the second edition of the book Horto by Auta de Souza, among others. In addition, he produced numerous prints by other artists, politicians and newspaper directors, which are now in various museums, personal collections and auctions.

On his return to Paris, Widhopff visited Montmartre and became friends with Alfons Mucha and Léon Deschamps, editor of La Plume. He also met Hugues Delorme and Jules Roques at Le Courrier français, giving rise to a fruitful collaboration with (among others) Adolphe Léon Willette to provide illustrations for it.

By the turn of the century, Widhopff was in the service of the Vollard gallery, the gallery belonging to Ambroise Vollard, one of the most important 20th-century contemporary French art dealers, who had hired him to make posters. Widhopff also created tapestries for the Beauvais factory during this time. His association with both places resumed in the 1920s.

During his lifetime, Widhopff earned acclaim for his ability to work equally well with both pencil and brush. His drawings, in particular, are known for their lively expressions, colorful imagery and rich humor.

== Posters and illustrations ==
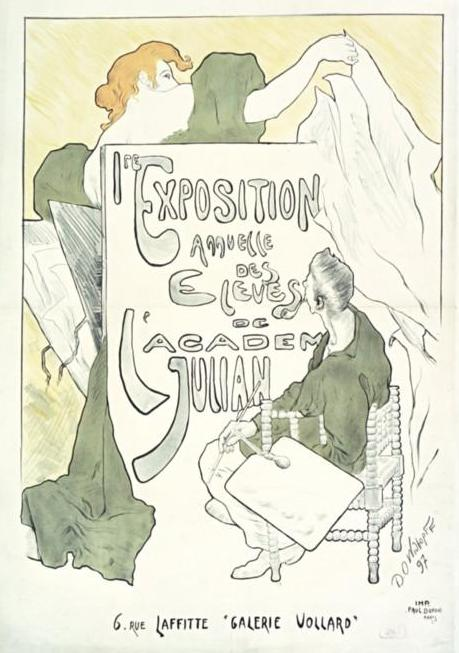
L'Exposition annuelle des Eleves de Académie Julian, 1st annual exhibition, held at Galerie Vollard, poster, 1897.

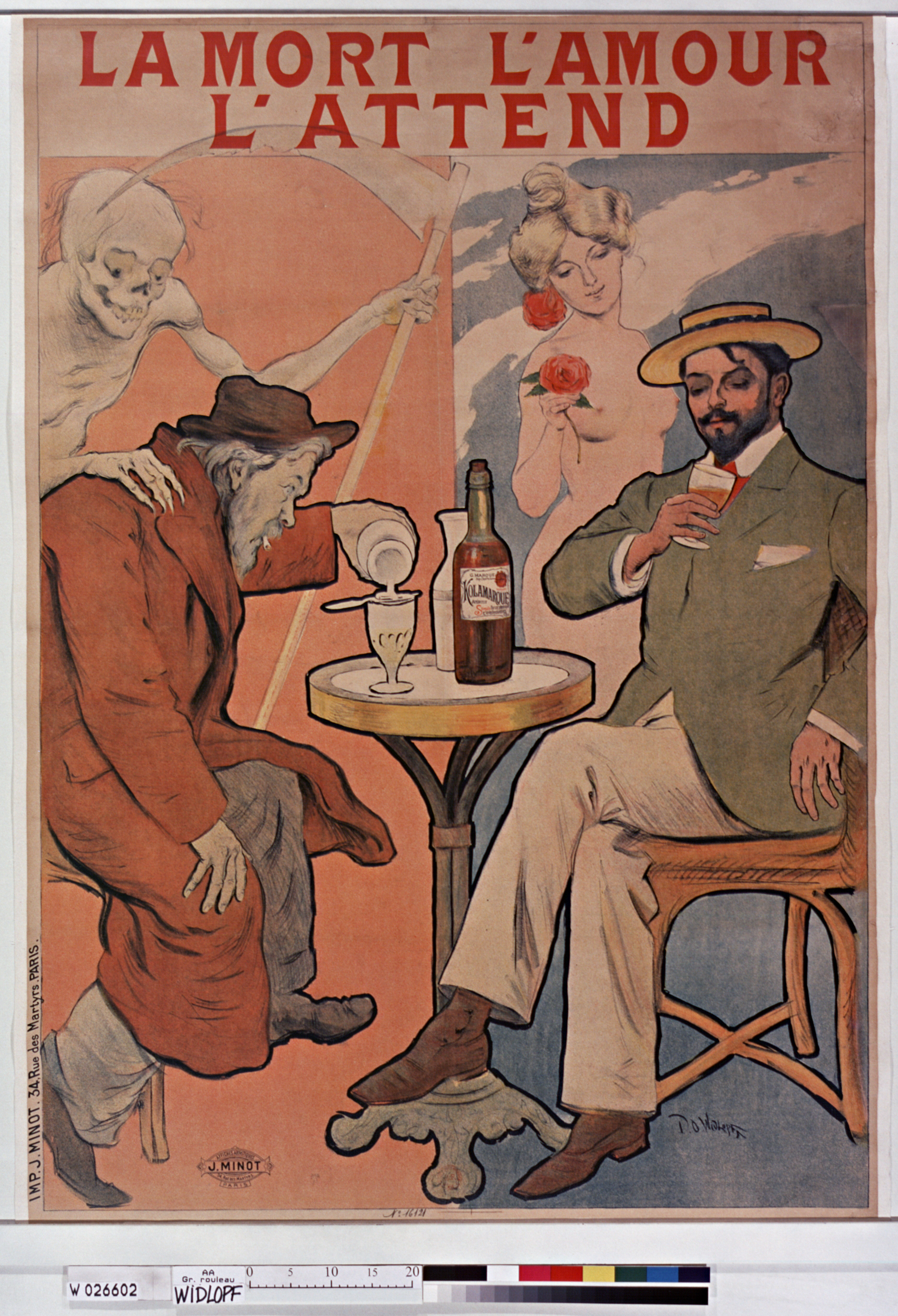
La mort, l'amour l'attend. (Eng: Death, love awaits.) Tag line for an alcoholism prevention campaign advertising Kolamarque, a caffeinated wine, 1901.

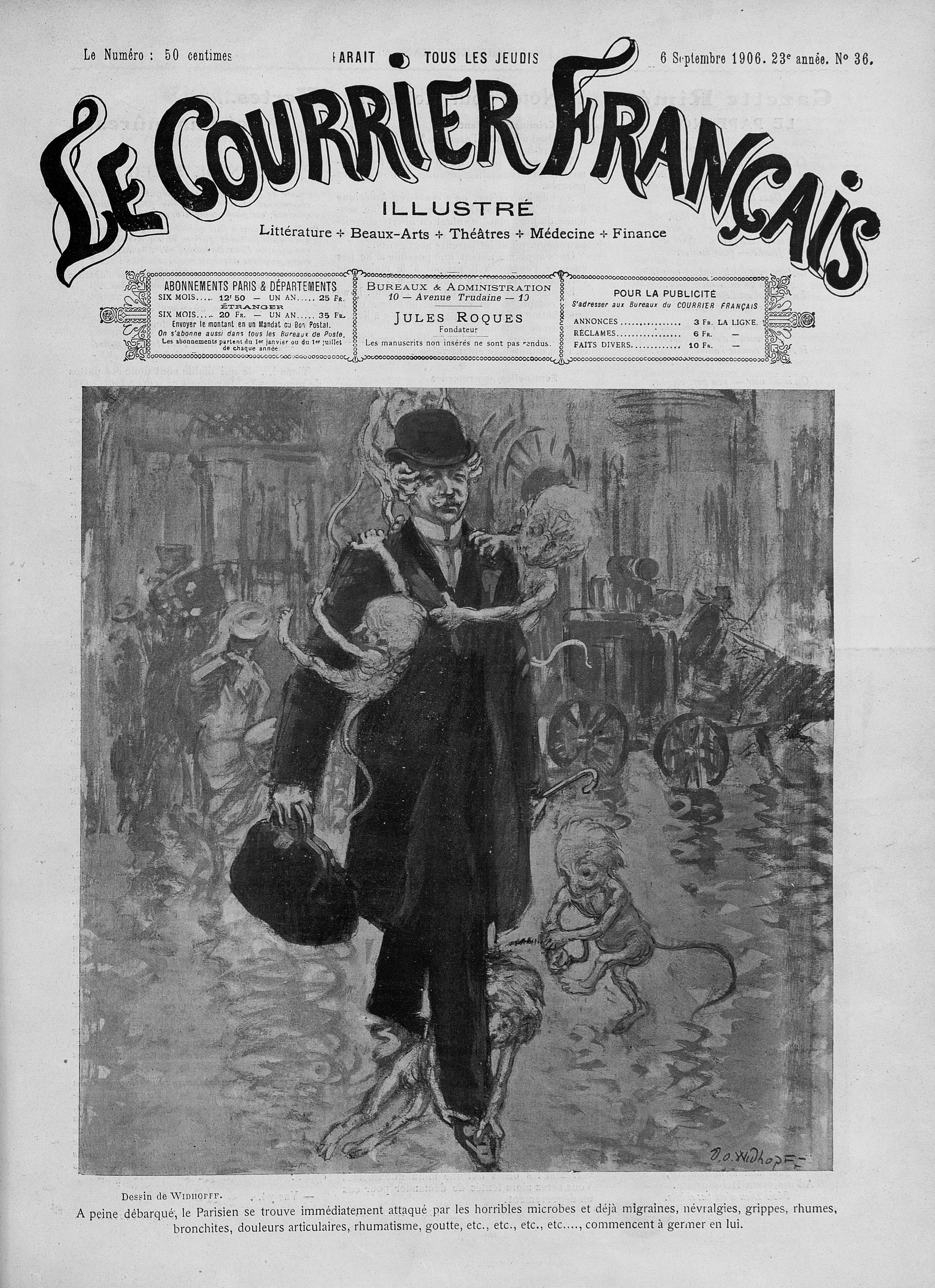
Le Courrier français, newspaper illustration, marked "Dessin de Widhopff," 1906.

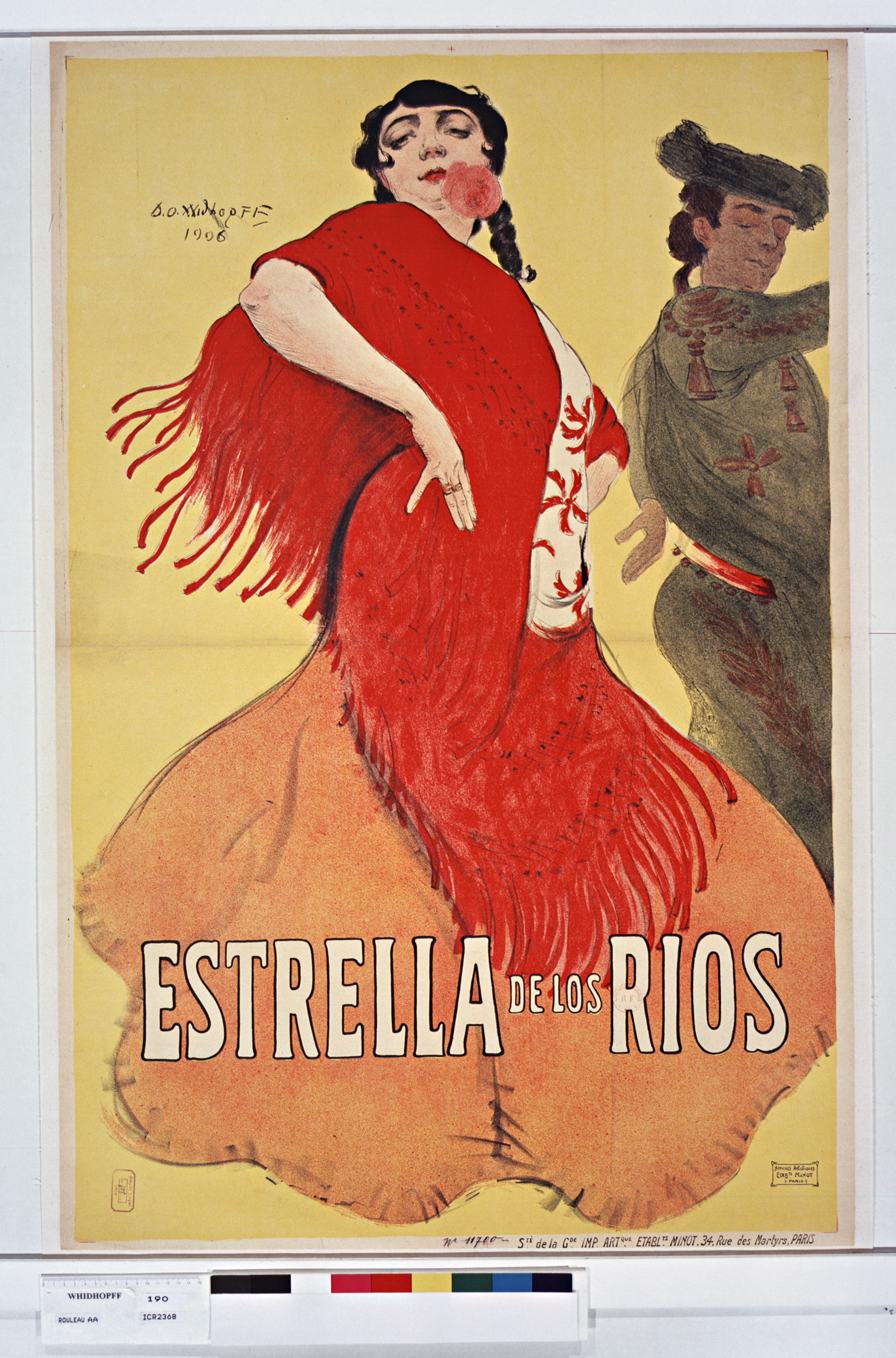
Estrella de los Rios, cabaret poster, 1906.

== Paintings ==
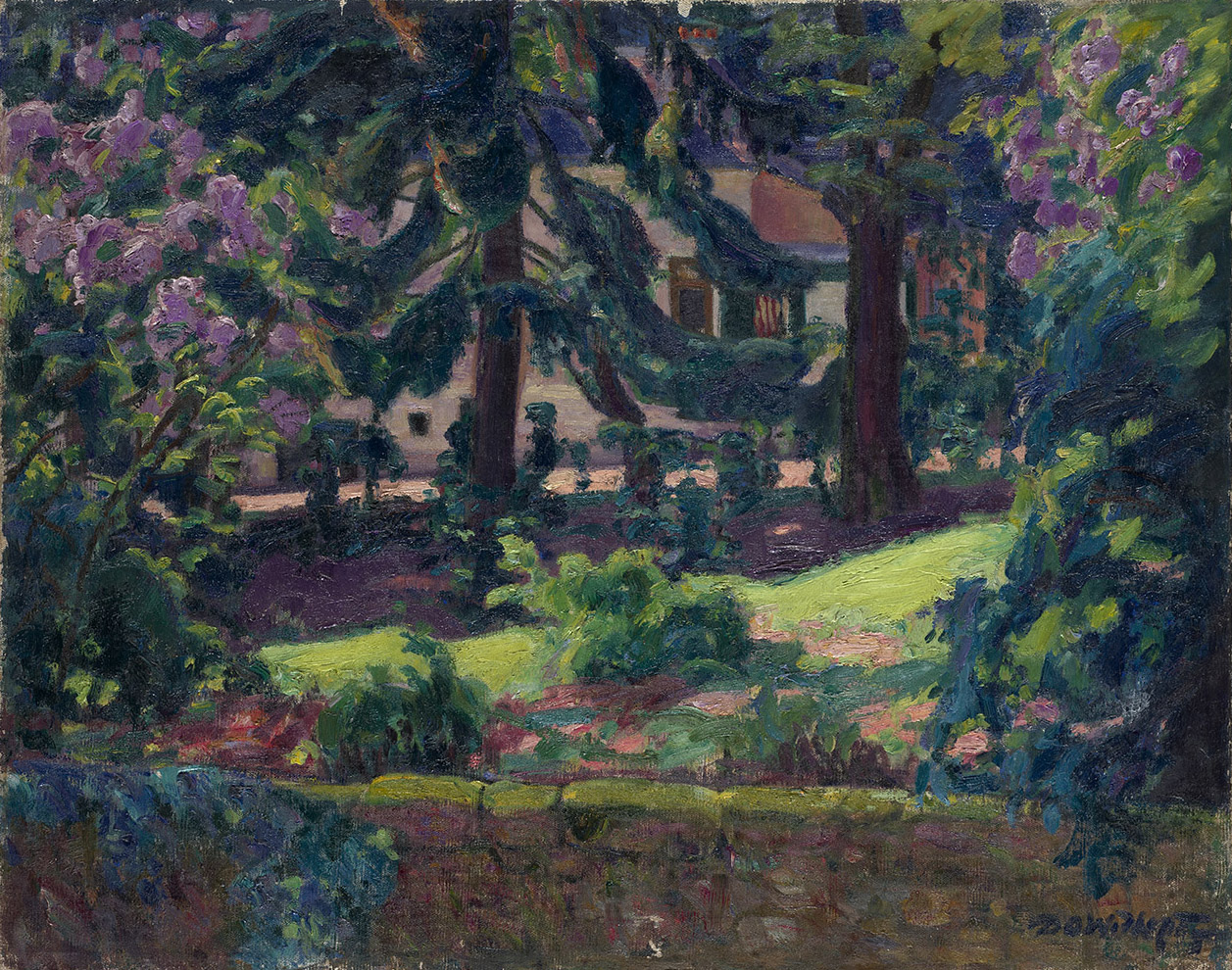
Landscape with Blooming Lilac, n.d.

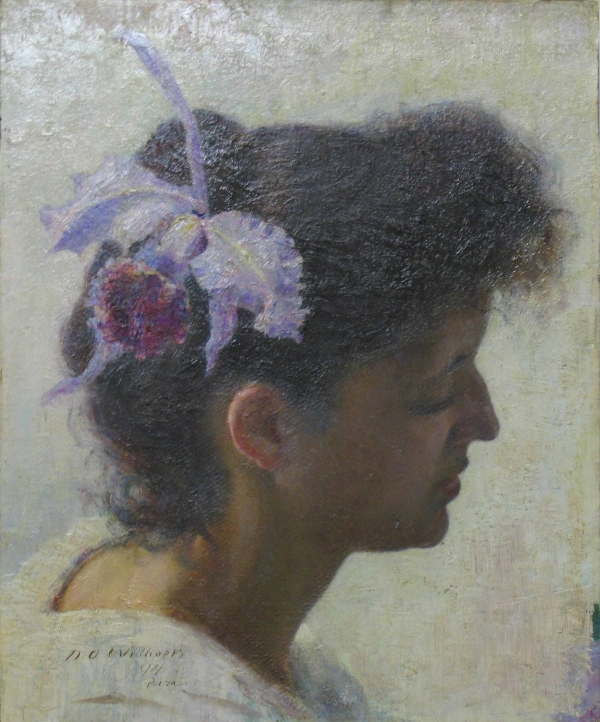
Girl with a Purple Flower, n.d.

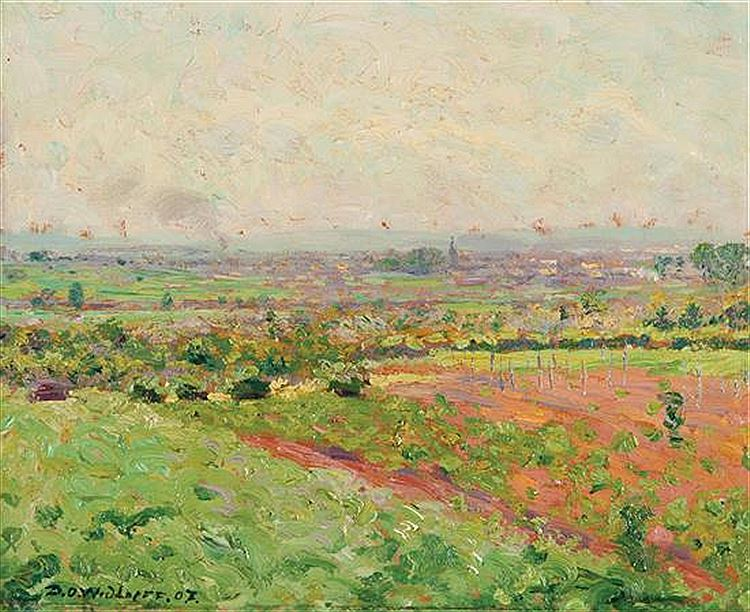
Spring in the Fields, n.d.

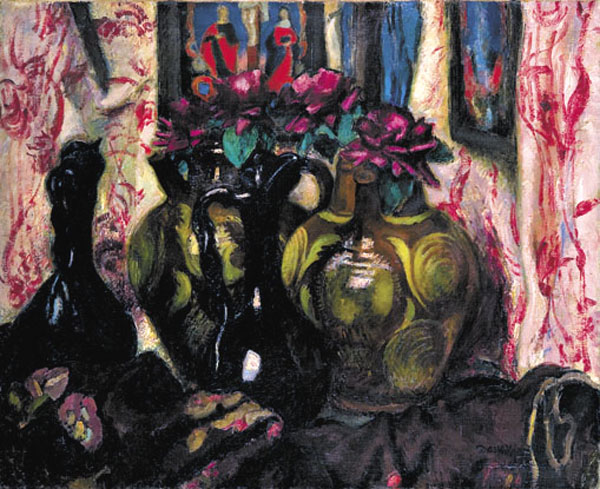
Still life with Purple Roses, n.d.

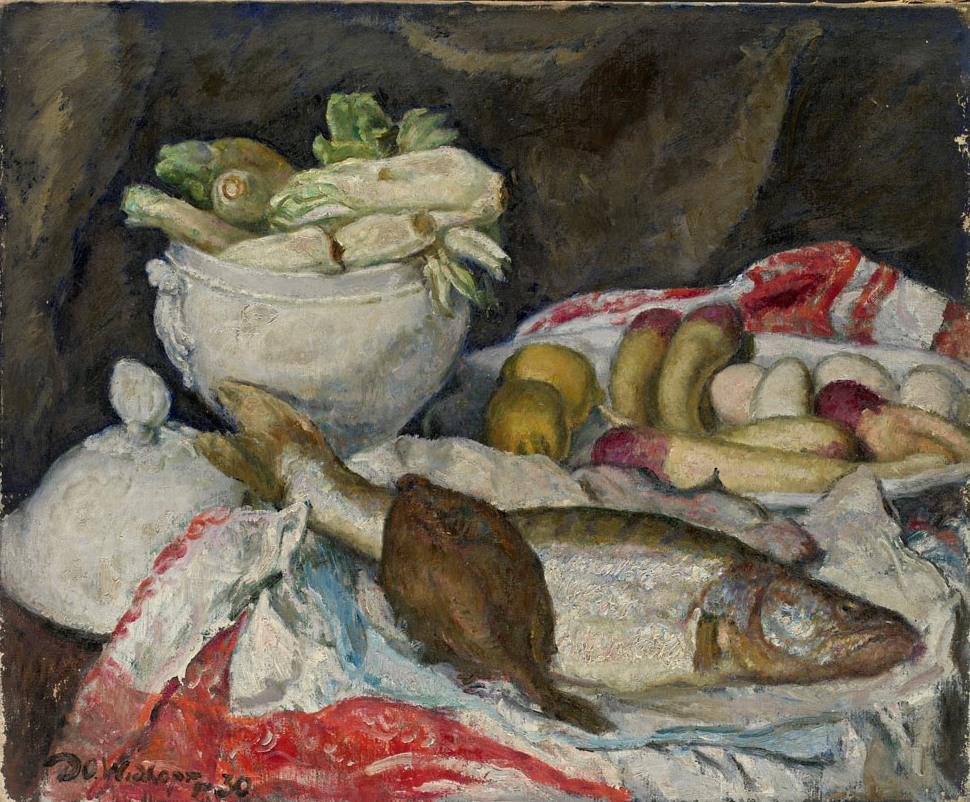
Still Life with Fish, n.d.

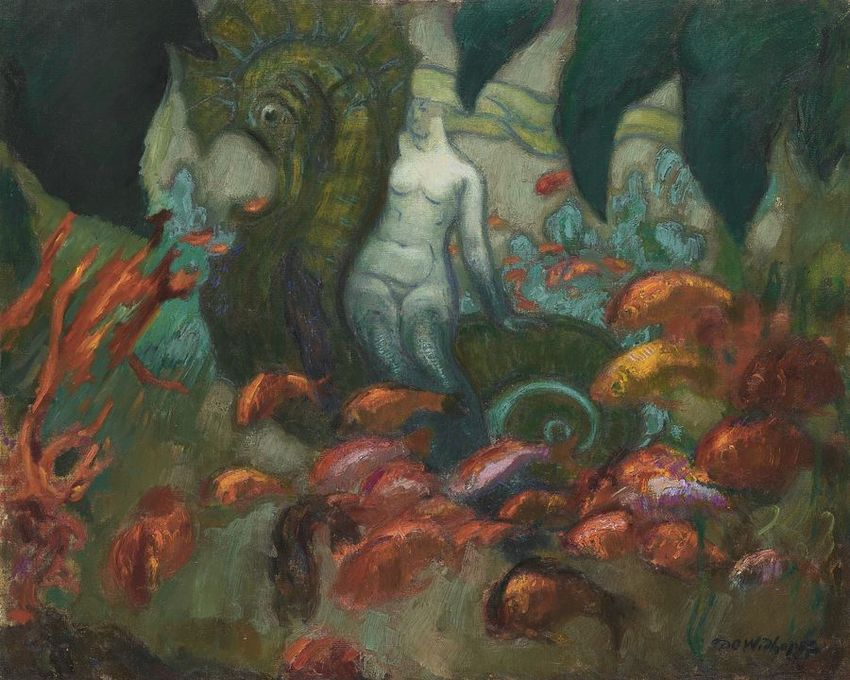
Underwater Kingdom, n.d.

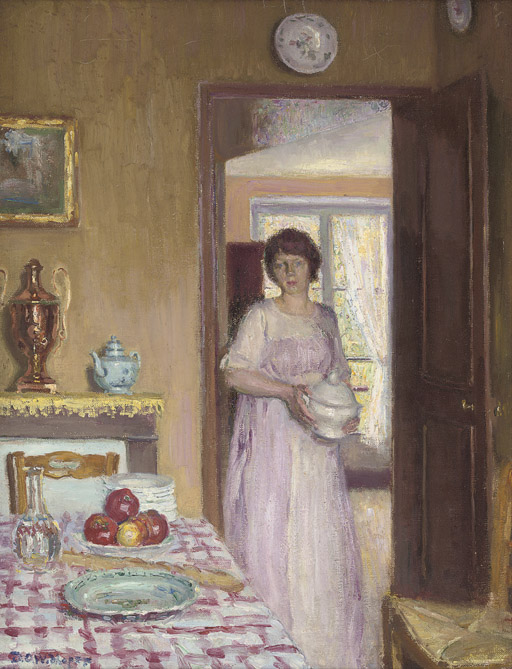
Laying the Table for Lunch, n.d.

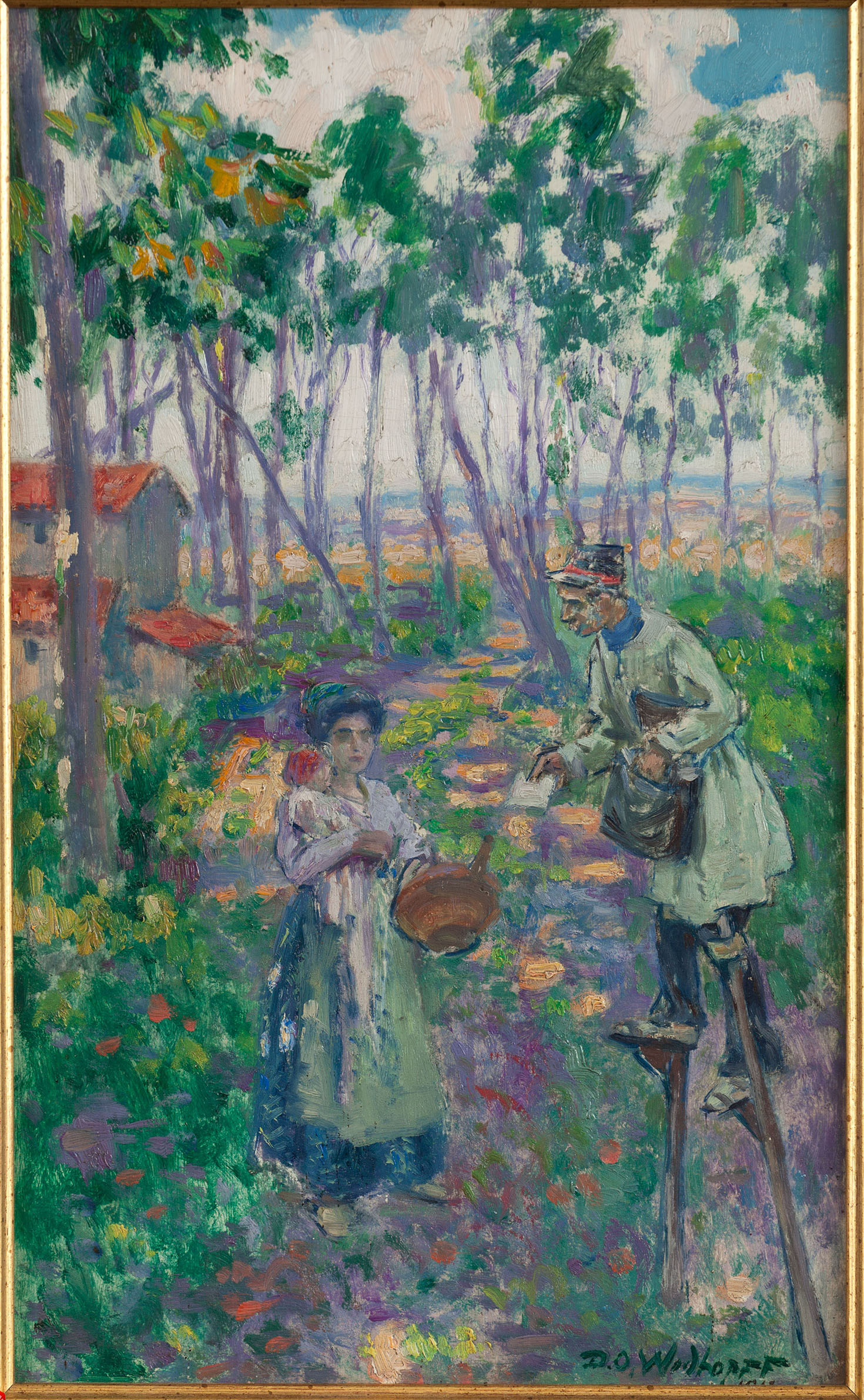
Postman, 1912.
