= LGBTQ culture in France =

LGBTQ culture in France encompasses three overlapping dimensions: the cultural practices specific to LGBTQ communities within France; the ways in which French LGBTI individuals articulate their identities—homosexual, bisexual, transgender, or intersex—through artistic and cultural expression; and the manner in which these identities and themes are represented, negotiated, or marginalized within mainstream cisgender and heterosexual French society, particularly in terms of visibility and social recognition.

== Literature ==
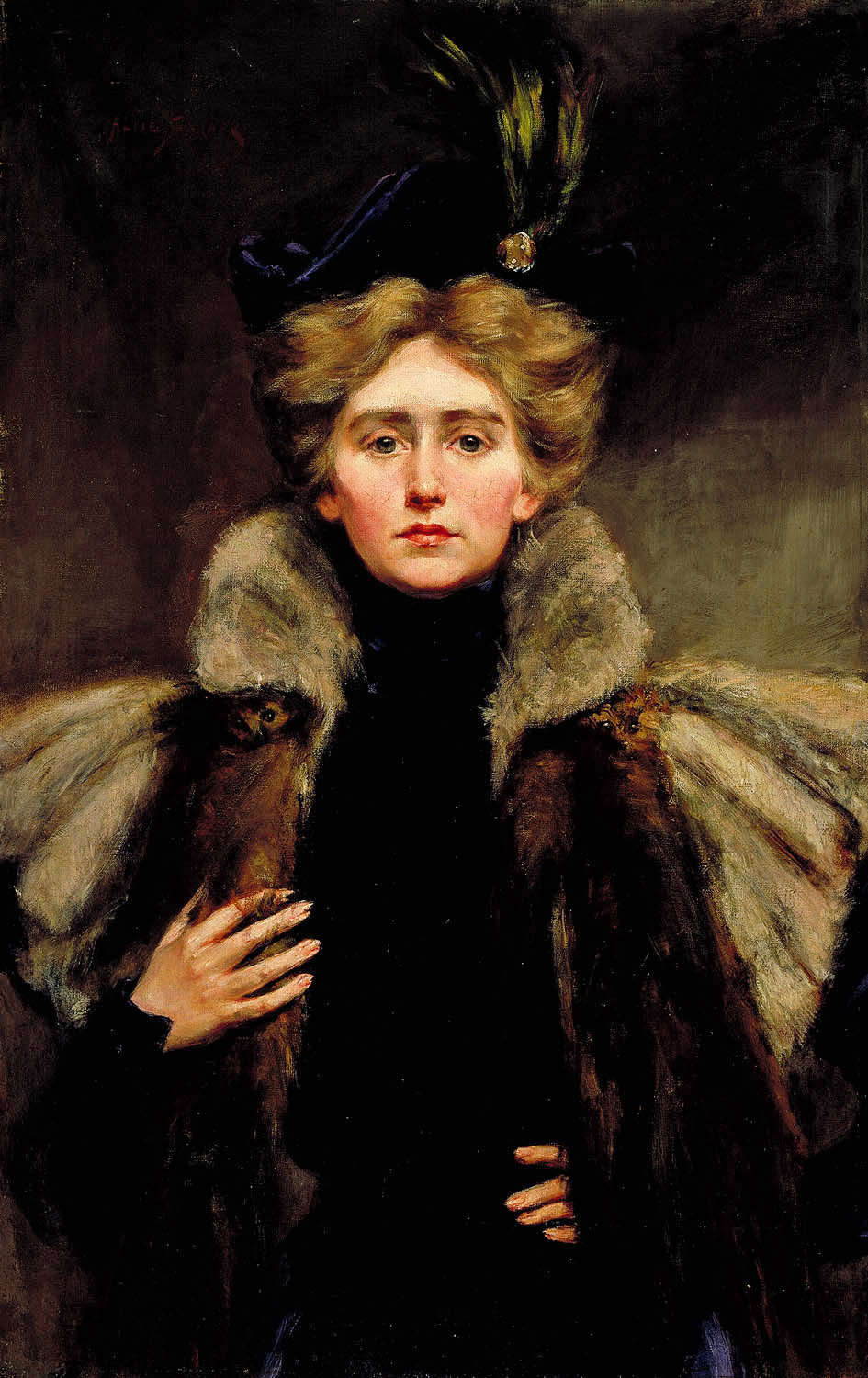
Natalie Barney hosted a salon in early 20th-century Paris that was frequented by lesbian writers.

=== Lesbian literature ===
At the beginning of the 20th century in Paris, an increasingly visible international lesbian community emerged, centered around literary salons organized by American lesbians such as Natalie Clifford Barney and Gertrude Stein. This community produced lesbian literary works in both French and English, including Idylle Saphique by Liane de Pougy, poems by Renée Vivien, Barney’s own epigrams, and both poetry and prose by Stein.

Due to a tightening of moral repression of homosexuality in the 1950s and 1960s, fewer lesbian works were published than before the war, leading to a noticeable decline in visibility. For example, the play Ravages by author Violette Leduc was censored because of its explicit lesbian content and only published in the 1960s under the title Thérèse et Isabelle, which was later adapted into a 1968 film of the same name.

Nevertheless, the 1950s did see the publication of some notable works, such as Rempart des béguines by Françoise Mallet-Joris, Qui qu’en grogne by Nicole Louvier, and Althia by Irène Monesi.

=== Gay literature ===
The emergence of a true gay literature dates back to the mid-19th century, with the erotic poetry of Albert Glatigny, Laurent Tailhade, Paul Verlaine, and Arthur Rimbaud (Hombres, Sonnet du trou du cul). These publications were released under pseudonyms or circulated clandestinely.

The end of the 19th century and the beginning of the 20th saw the emergence of novels depicting homosexual relationships: À rebours by Joris-Karl Huysmans, Monsieur de Phocas by Jean Lorrain, as well as the works of Marcel Proust, Joséphin Péladan, Léon-Paul Fargue, Marcel Jouhandeau, and Robert de Montesquiou.

The gay literature of the 1920s was also particularly rich: André Gide, especially with his novel Corydon, was a central figure of the period, alongside his close associates Pierre Herbart and François-Paul Alibert, who respectively wrote L’Âge d’or and Le Supplice d’une queue. At the same time, Roger Martin du Gard published The Memoirs of Lieutenant-Colonel de Maumort and Les Thibault. The period was still marked by repression: Jean Cocteau published Le Livre blanc clandestinely.

=== Children’s literature ===
In the 1990s, as children’s literature began to address the issue of homosexuality, it was primarily through the lens of AIDS, aiming to help children cope with the loss of a loved one. It was in the 2000s that the first youth novels appeared in which the protagonist developed a lesbian relationship.

== Comics ==
In the 1950s, comics were intended for a young audience, and it was unthinkable to depict romantic or sexual relationships, let alone homosexual ones. It was not until the emergence of the Argentine artist Copi in the press of the 1960s that homosexuality, lesbianism, or transgender identity began to be addressed, and only in the 1980s, when comics became more adult-oriented, did these themes become more common.

When Journal by Fabrice Neaud (1996) achieved success, it seemed that the mention of his homosexuality in autobiographical comics no longer posed a problem. Around the same time, the appearance of Tom de Pékin, a graphic designer and illustrator influenced by queer aesthetics, who collaborated with SNEG and Têtu, was also noted. The lesbian comic Les Marsouines by Arbrelune and Jour de pluie were, however, self-published. The collection Bulles gaies published works with autobiographical inspiration, such as Les Folles Nuits de Jonathan by Jean-Paul Jennequin and Jean-François fait de la résistance by Hugues Barthe. A Marseille-based gay and lesbian magazine, Hercule et la toison d’or, also revealed new talents such as Hélène Georges. Illustrators like Kinu Sekiguchi and Sven de Rennes attempted comics influenced by Spanish and Japanese queer aesthetics.

A gay porn comic magazine (Ultimen) was launched by an adult video company and distributed at newsstands, but without media support, the publication was discontinued. H&O became one of the main publishers of gay comics in France, notably distributing works by Logan.

Although gay and lesbian characters became increasingly common in the late 1990s, they were often secondary characters or were portrayed in a pornographic or caricatured manner. The end of the 2000s marked a turning point in lesbian comics, with the 2008 publication of Princesse aime Princesse by Lisa Mandel and, in 2010, Blue Is the Warmest Color (Le bleu est une couleur chaude) by Jul' Maroh, which was selected for the Angoulême International Comics Festival. According to Lisa Mandel, this shift stemmed from renewed confidence among lesbian authors and gay writers, who were increasingly willing to submit their stories to publishers. Critical acclaim helped counterbalance instances of homophobic backlash from certain festivals or segments of the public.

== Drawings ==
Starting in 2017, Moroccan artist Soufiane Ababri, who primarily resides in France, gained recognition for his work, particularly Haunted Lives and Bed Work, for which he won the Out d’or award in 2018. Sex, desire, and the interplay of gazes are central elements in his creations, as well as the violence experienced by racialized gay men, whether inflicted by society or by other gay men.

== Music ==
In France, artists who become gay icons rarely speak explicitly about relationships between men. Instead, identification tends to occur through projection—where a woman sings about (heterosexual) desire for a man, and the gay audience can interpret this as a representation of gay love. These singers often embody an exaggerated femininity and a stylized fashion sense that plays with gender codes, ranging from hyper-femininity to androgyny. Their songs frequently include dramatic themes that resonate with the traumas of homophobia or, later, the AIDS epidemic. Among the French-speaking female singers particularly beloved by the French gay public are Barbara, Mylène Farmer, Sheila, Mistinguett, Line Renaud, Amanda Lear, and Mireille Mathieu.

The arrival of disco in France, along with techno remixes of these artists’ songs, helped integrate them into the playlists of gay nightclubs, allowing them to renew and expand their audiences. This relationship between gay audiences and the artists is often reciprocal—many of these singers later became involved in the fight against HIV/AIDS.

At the end of the 1990s and into the early 2000s, the collective Pussy Killer established itself as a techno reference point for lesbian and underground parties in Paris, especially those at the club Pulp. Another notable figure from the same era is Liza 'N' Eliaz, known for her hardcore music style. While the vast majority of Parisian queer parties typically feature electronic and pop music, those with “ethnic” themes (Afro-Caribbean, Arab-inspired, or Asian) offer greater diversity, including genres such as R’n’B, raï, hip-hop, and reggae.
