= Alphonse Roubichou =

French painter

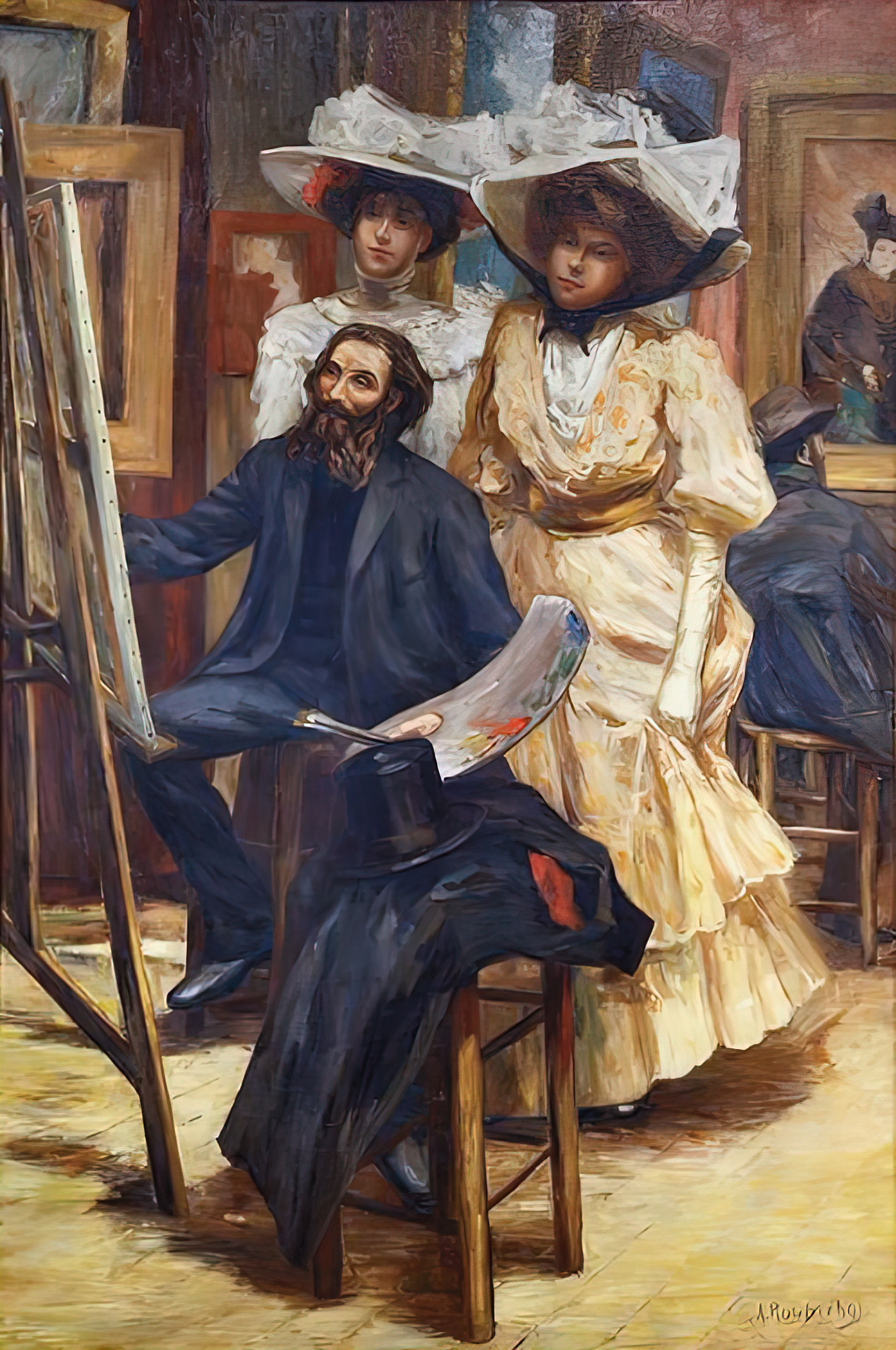
- Born: 1861; Pamiers, France
- Died: 1938 (aged 76–77)
- Occupation: Painter

Alphonse Pierre Roubichou (October 30, 1861 – April 13, 1938) was a French painter. His work was part of the painting event in the art competition at the 1928 Summer Olympics.

== Biography ==
A native of Ariège (department), Roubichou was the son of Justin Roubichou, a carpenter in Pamiers, and Anne Vergé.

Roubichou studied painting under Jean-Paul Laurens and Benjamin-Constant and became a landscape and still-life painter.

Created by Léon Deschamps, it was featured in February 1894 at the first exhibition of the Salon des Cent, an art show with no jury or prizes.

Deeply connected to his homeland, he painted Joseph Lakanal house in Serres-sur-Arget and various other works related to the village, as well as numerous landscapes such as Stream in the Woods.

A prolific painter in Paris, he exhibited at the Salon d'Automne from 1903 to 1905, and then again in 1911. At the 1903 Salon, he had his studio at 18bis Impasse du Maine (now Rue Antoine-Bourdelle) and exhibited two paintings titled Grange de Gogibus (Matin) and Les Peupliers à Orthelon. He painted his Parisian surroundings—such as Impasse du Maine, Paris—and scenes of the Seine, including La Seine et l’île Saint-Louis, Le Bateau-lavoir, and Quai de la Seine. Roubichou exhibited regularly at the Salon des Artistes Français, of which he became a member in 1893, at the Grand Palais on the Champs-Élysées. He was awarded bronze and silver medals in 1924 and 1925, respectively.

He participated in the Olympic Games of Art in Amsterdam in 1928 with Aviron sur jardin des Tuileries.

He never married and died on April 13, 1938, in the 13th arrondissement of Paris.
