= Raoul Ponchon =

French poet

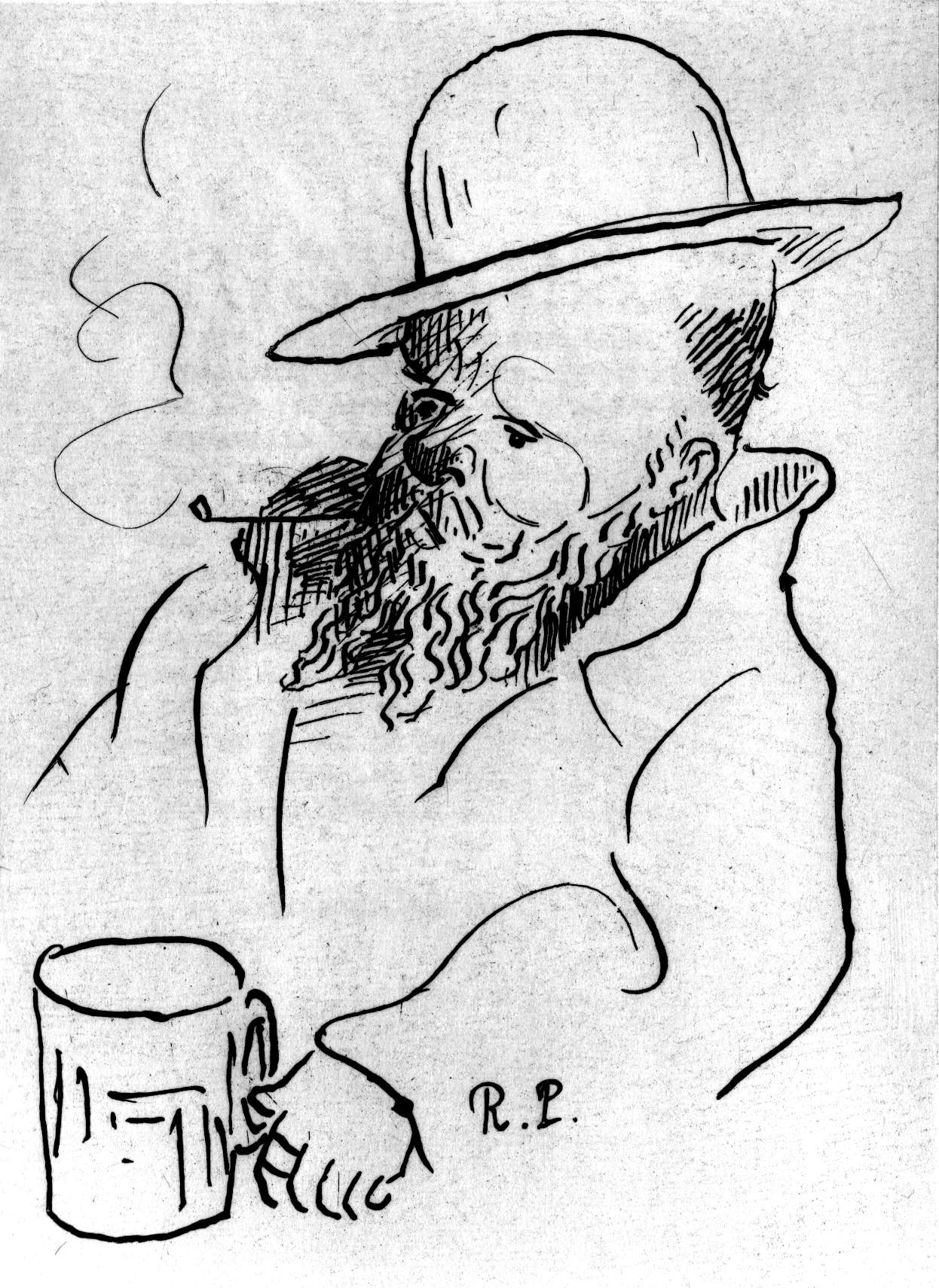
Ponchon, Muse gaillarde frontispice, ed. 1939

Raoul Ponchon (French pronunciation: [ʁaul pɔ̃ʃɔ̃]; born 30 December 1848 in La Roche-sur-Yon, France, died 3 December 1937 in Paris, France) was a French poet. A friend of Arthur Rimbaud, he was one of only "seven known recipients" of the first edition of A Season in Hell. He was a contributor to the satirical weekly Le Courrier français.

Raoul was one of the founders of the Zutist Group.

Though he did not care for honors, he was elected to the Académie Goncourt in 1924. He was made a knight of the Legion of Honor on 4 January 1925, and elevated to the rank of officer on 12 December 1932.

He considered himself a poetaster unworthy of official publication, and the only book he published in his lifetime was La Muse au cabaret, which appeared in 1920, when he was 72 years old.

Ponchon is the first entry in Guillaume Apollinaire's Contemporains pittoresques. Apollinaire writes: "The last of our Bacchic poets, and one of our best, is an angry drunk [...] this little miracle of a lyric journalist is perhaps the only example now existing of a writer or poet in whose talent appears no immediate trace of any foreign literature. Notwithstanding his other talents, his intentional manner, his spontaneous art, it is above all this that renders him interesting, since, my God, we well know that he's spent his life trying to do violence to himself in order to remain an insignificant poet. It's a sort of pride rare in our days, and to have it much is necessary: one needs a lot of talent, and one needs to drink."

Apollinaire recounts an anecdote in which excessive drunkenness almost cost Ponchon his life, and speaks of the rare devotion he bore towards his friends, despite his general misanthropy and bursts of temper.

Ponchon died on 3 December 1937, at the hôpital Saint-Joseph in Paris, after an attack of pulmonary edema.

== See also ==
- Nina de Villard de Callias
- Zutiste
