= La Plume =

French literary magazine

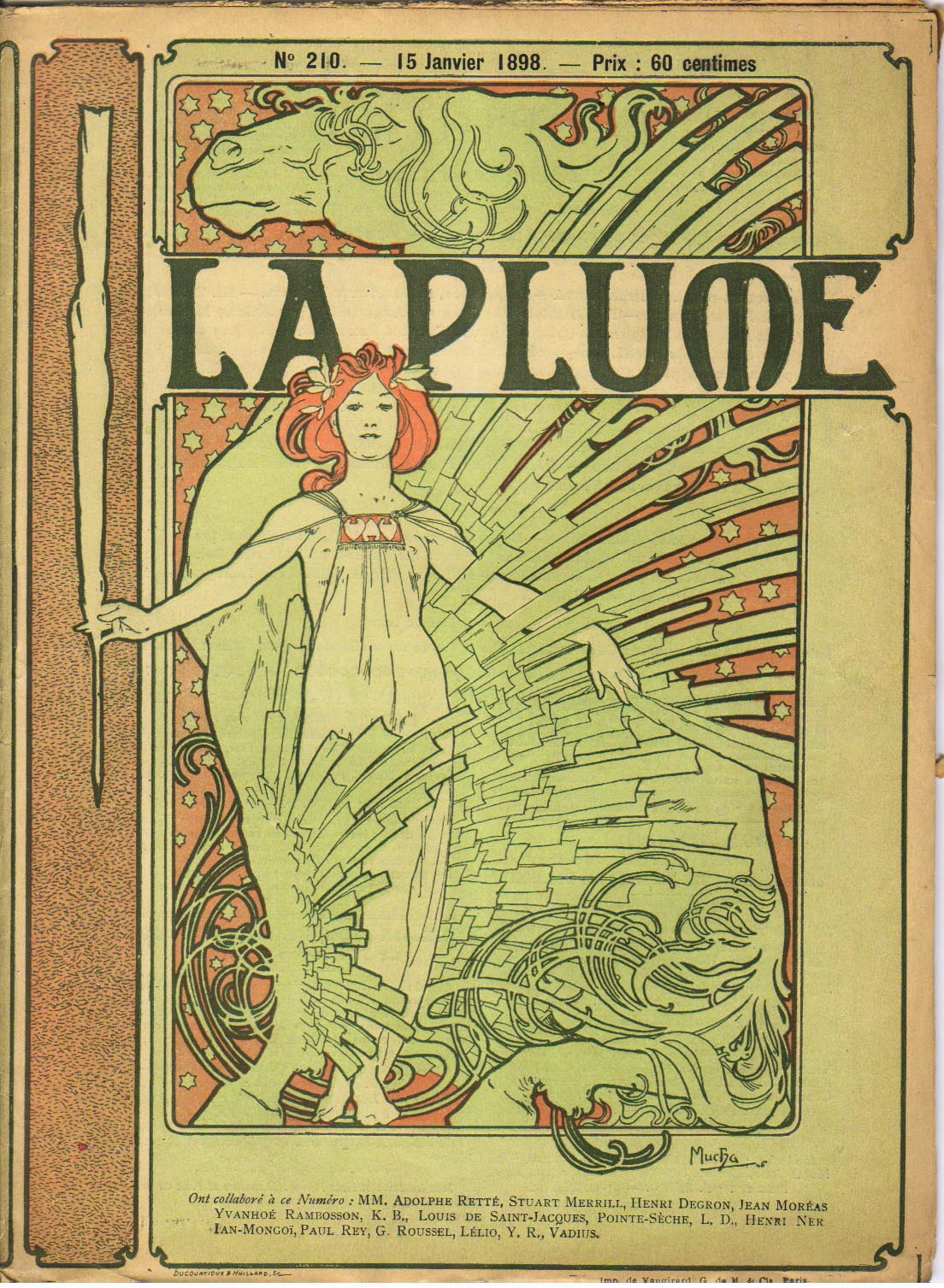
- Cover art by Alfons Mucha for La Plume (1898)
- Categories: art and literature
- Frequency: bi-monthly
- First issue: 1889
- Final issue: 1914
- Country: France
- Based in: Paris

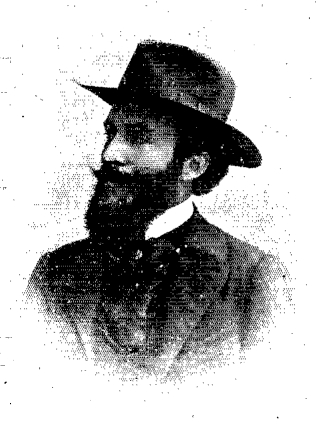
Karl Boès, editor 1899 to 1914

La Plume (French pronunciation: [la plym]) was a French bi-monthly literary and artistic review. The magazine was set up in 1889 by Léon Deschamps, who edited it for ten years and was succeeded as editor by Karl Boès from 1899 to 1914.

Its offices were at number 31 rue Bonaparte, Paris.

From its beginning, famous artists such as Willette, Forain, Eugène Grasset, Toulouse-Lautrec, Maurice Denis, Mucha, Gauguin, Pissarro, Félicien Rops, Signac, Seurat, and Redon contributed to it. One of its most famous issues is that devoted to Le Chat Noir. The magazine supported the symbolist art movement.

From 1903, La Plume sponsored weekly poetry events which included famous poets such as Max Jacob and Alfred Jarry. These evenings were held at the café du Soleil, later the café du Départ. The magazine folded in 1914.
