= Zutiste =

Informal group of French musicians, poets and painters

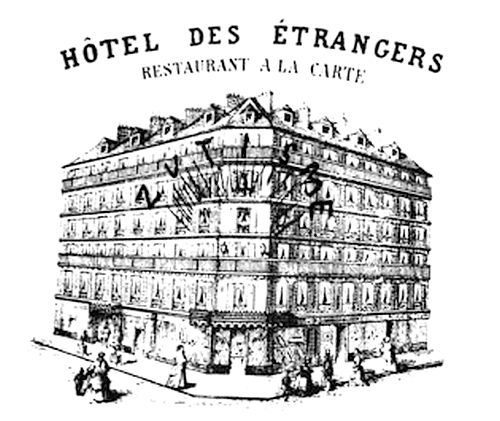
The group met at the Hôtel des Étrangers

The Zutistes or the Circle of Poets Zutiques was an informal group of French poets, painters and musicians who met at the Hôtel des Étrangers, at the corner of rue Racine and rue de l'École-de-Médecine, in Paris in September and October 1871.

== Background ==
The Zutistes were a fringe spin-off from a splinter group of Parnassians, known as the "Nasty Fellows" or "Villains Bonshommes", who formed a Parisian dining club at the close of the 1860s. Without having a formal manifesto, and taking their name from the French exclamation of baffled exasperation, Zut, this informal gathering of artists known as the Zutistes gathered around the figure of the pianist Ernest Cabaner, who worked as a bartender/piano player at the hotel. Anarchic in spirit, they looked back regretfully to the atmosphere of the Paris Commune of March to May 1871. A significant figure in the circle was Charles Cros, while other members were later better known, like Verlaine and Rimbaud.

== The Album ==
The most significant trace of the movement came with the re-discovery in the Thirties of the Zutique Album, with some 101 literary entries accompanied by (sometimes pornographic) drawings, including "Sonnet to an Asshole."

Full of black humour, parody, and pastiche of contemporary styles and attitudes, the album is a guide to the Circle's membership of 14 names. A central target of the album's mockery was the successful Parnassian Francois Coppee, and more established figures like José-Maria de Heredia and Leconte de Lisle were also in the line of fire. This album in quarto has a black hardback cover and about 30 handwritten sheets, with the other pages remaining blank.

== Aftermath ==
Nostalgia for the circle persisted among its members long after its break-up, perhaps as early as the winter of 1871–1872: thus for example the young Zutiste Raoul Ponchon was one of only seven recipients of Rimbaud's A Season in Hell; Charles Cros in 1883 used "zutique" to name a new poetry circle; while (perhaps coincidentally) as late as in 1897 the claim would be made that "man is by nature essentially 'zutique'".

== See also ==
- Dada
- Decadent movement
- Pierre Cambronne
- Poète maudit
