= Sonnet to an Asshole =

Sonnet by Arthur Rimbaud and Paul Verlaine

"The Idol — Sonnet of the Asshole" (French: L’Idole — Sonnet du trou du cul) is a sonnet in alexandrines written by Paul Verlaine and Arthur Rimbaud in Paris in 1871. It is both a celebration of the human anus and a parody of the fetishisation of the female body by Albert Mérat (within his collection L'Idole) and other Parnassian poets. The poem pushed the limits "not only of acceptable poetic and social behavior, but of French verse in its formal intelligibility too."

From 1871 through 1873, Rimbaud and Verlaine engaged in a tempestuous sexual and romantic relationship, the latter committing infidelity against his wife Mathilde Mauté. They are regarded by scholars as the first openly homosexual couple in modern literary history. Verlaine composed the sonnet's quatrains and Rimbaud wrote the tercets, with both poets pastiching the style of the other. The poem was written into the Album zutique and later collected in Verlaine's privately printed volume Hombres.

== Poem ==
Le Sonnet du Trou du Cul

Obscur et froncé comme un œillet violet
Il respire, humblement tapi parmi la mousse
Humide encor d’amour qui suit la fuite douce
Des Fesses blanches jusqu’au cœur de son ourlet.

Des filaments pareils à des larmes de lait
Ont pleuré, sous le vent cruel qui les repousse,
À travers de petits caillots de marne rousse
Pour s’aller perdre où la pente les appelait.

Mon Rêve s’aboucha souvent à sa ventouse;
Mon âme, du coït matériel jalouse,
En fit son larmier fauve et son nid de sanglots.

C’est l’olive pâmée, et la flûte câline,
C’est le tube où descend la céleste praline:
Chanaan féminin dans les moiteurs enclos!

— Paul Verlaine and Arthur Rimbaud (1871), "Album zutique"
Translation:
Sonnet: To The Asshole

Dark, puckered hole: a purple carnation
That trembles, nestled among the moss (still wet
With love) covering the gentle curvation
Of the white ass, just to the royal eyelet.
Threads resembling milky tears there are spun;
Spray forced back by the south wind's cruel threat
Across the small balls of brown shit has run,
To drip from the crack, which craves for it yet.

Not wishing the prick to have its bent,
My mouth too has often mated with that vent,
My sobbing tongue tried to devour the rose
Flowering in brown moisture. The chute unmanned,
It's a heavenly jam-pot, the Promised Land
Which with other milk and honey overflows!

— J. Murat & W. Gunn (1979), "A Lover's Cock And Other Gay Poems"
