= Léon Deschamps =

French novelist and poet

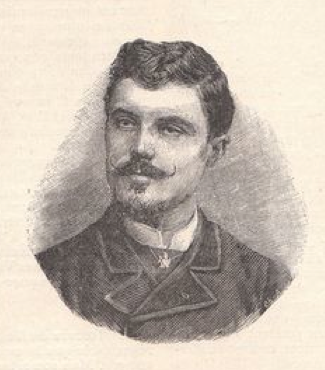
- Born: 1864
- Died: 28 December 1899 (aged 34–35)
- Writing career
- Notable work: La Plume

Signature
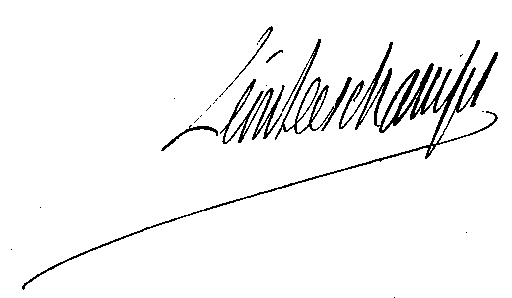

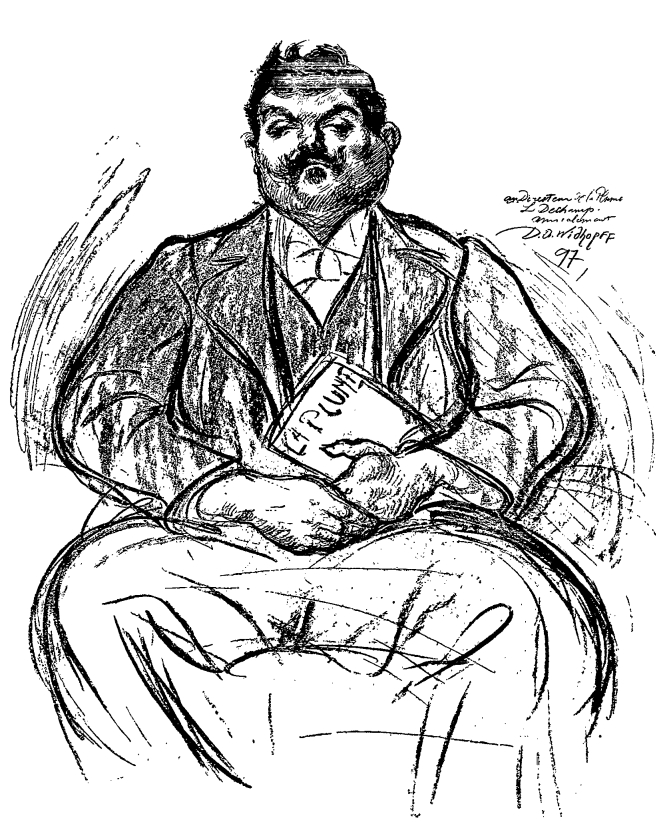
Léon Deschamps Portrait by David Ossipovitch Widhopff.

Léon Deschamps (1864 – 28 December 1899) was a French novelist and poet, most notable as the founder of the La Plume literary review.

== Career ==
Deschamps was from Poitou and trained as a cook. He quit this career to become a commercial agent for Gazette du Palais in Paris.

He founded La Plume on 15 April 1889. His close friends, George Bonnamour and Paul Redonnel, were also involved in the management and editorship of the review. The review had a conservative-leaning, although Deschamps himself had reactionary sympathies.

He led the review until his sudden death at age 36 in 1899.
