= Adolphe Willette =

French painter (1857–1926)

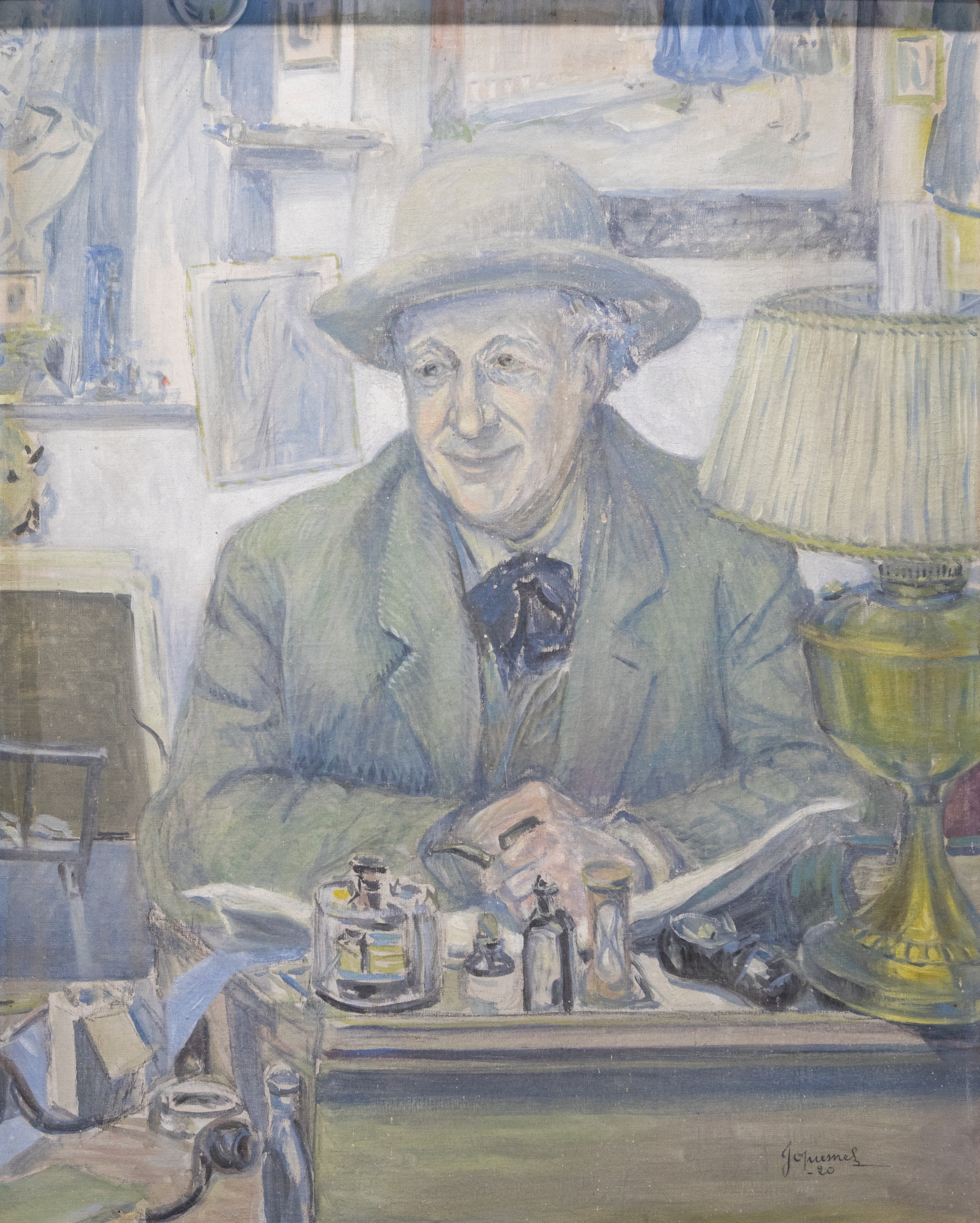
Portrait of 1920 made by Joseph Quesnel, museum Quesnel-Morinière de Coutances.

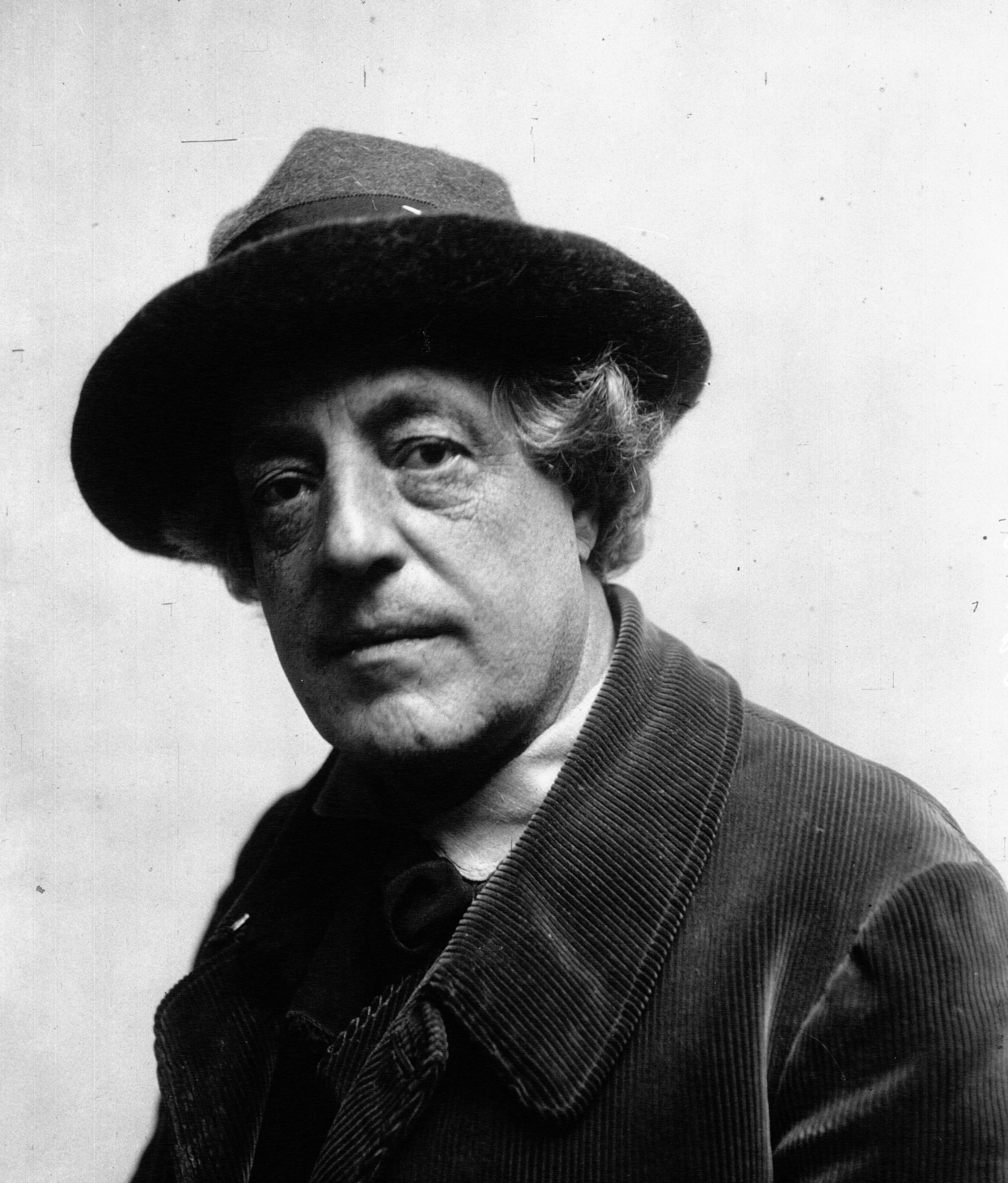
Adolphe Willette in 1913

Adolphe Léon Willette (30 July 1857 – 4 February 1926) was a French painter, illustrator, caricaturist, and lithographer, as well as an architect of the famous Moulin Rouge cabaret. Willette ran as an "anti-semitic" candidate in the 9th arrondissement of Paris for the September 1889 legislative elections.

== Biography ==
Willette studied for four years at the École des Beaux-Arts under Alexandre Cabanel. His graphical work ranged from dainty triviality or political satire: he made Pierrot an imaginary hero of France, and established Mimi Pinson as frail, lovable, and essentially good-hearted. He could also be bitter and fierce, a partisan of political ideas. The guillotine and the figure of Death appear in his caricatures. At the time of the Dreyfus affair he was an anti-dreyfusard; with Jean-Louis Forain, he moved to the political right.

== Works ==
The artist was a prolific contributor to the French illustrated press under the pseudonyms "Cémoi", "Pierrot", "Louison", "Bébé", and "Nox", but more often under his own name. He illustrated Melandri's Les Pierrots and Les Giboulles d'avril, Le Courrier français, and published his own Pauvre Pierrot and other works, in which he tells his stories in scenes in the manner of Busch. He decorated several "brasseries artistiques" with wall-paintings, stained glass, and so on notably Le Chat noir and La Palette d'or, and he painted the ceiling for La Cigale music hall. Willette contributed to the Salon des Cent and six of his posters were published in Les Maîtres de l'Affiche. A collection of his works was exhibited in 1888. His V'almy is in the Luxembourg, Paris.

Willette's characteristically fantastic Parce Domine was commissioned by Rodolphe Salis for Le Chat Noir in Montmartre. It was shown in the Franco-British Exhibition in 1908.

== Selected works ==
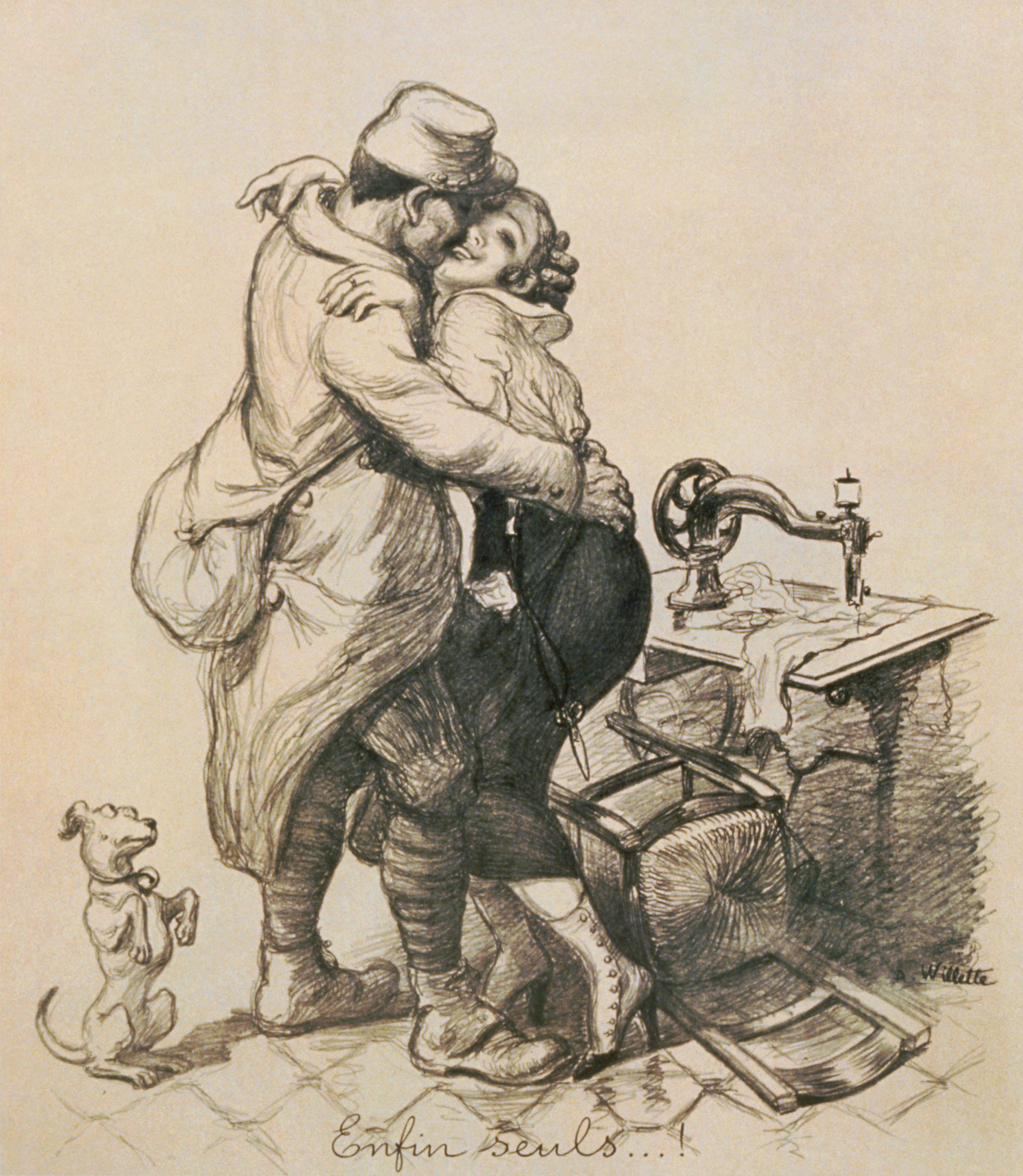
Journée du Poilu.
25 et 26 décembre 1915

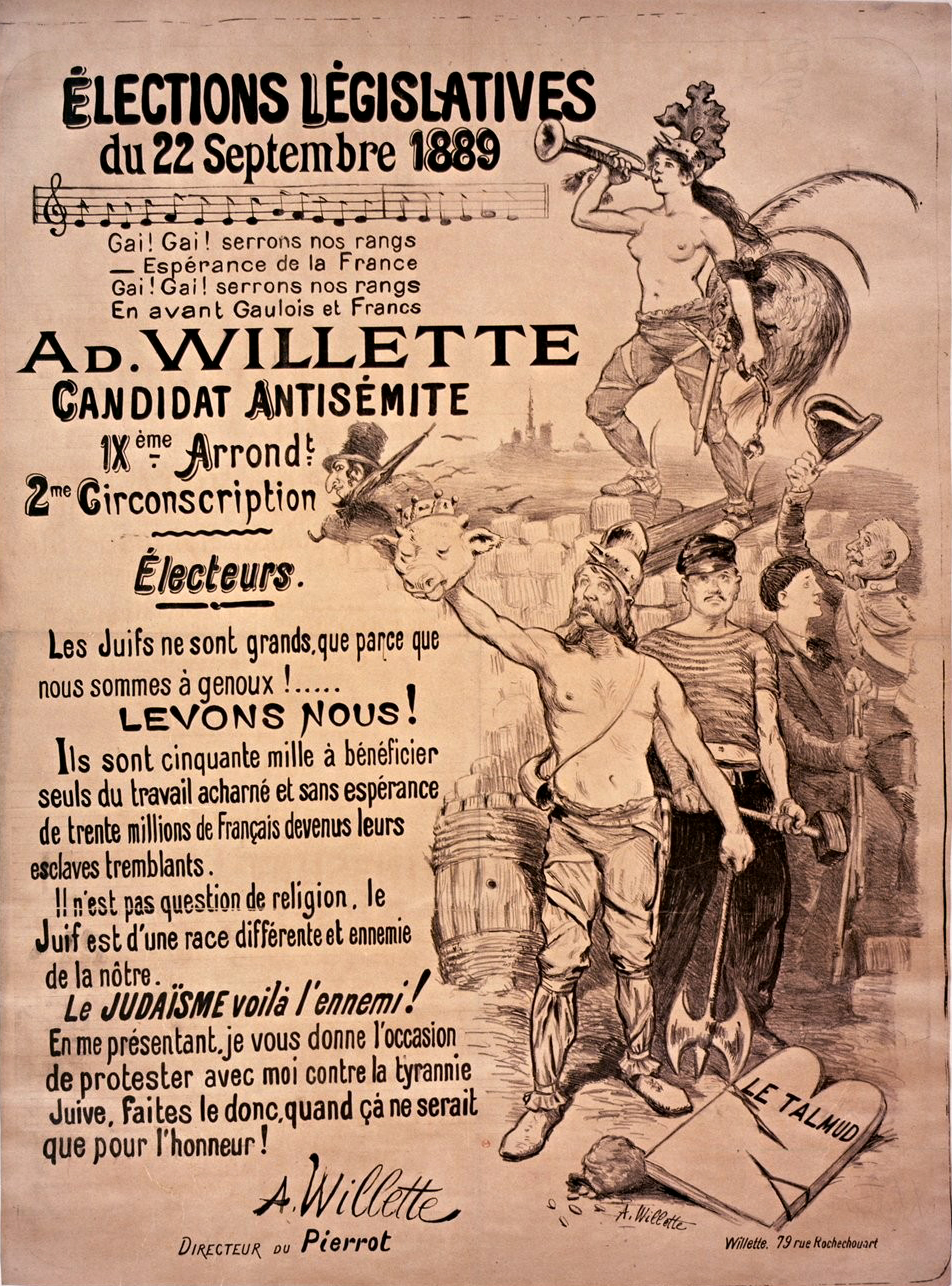
Anti-Semitic Election poster
for Willette

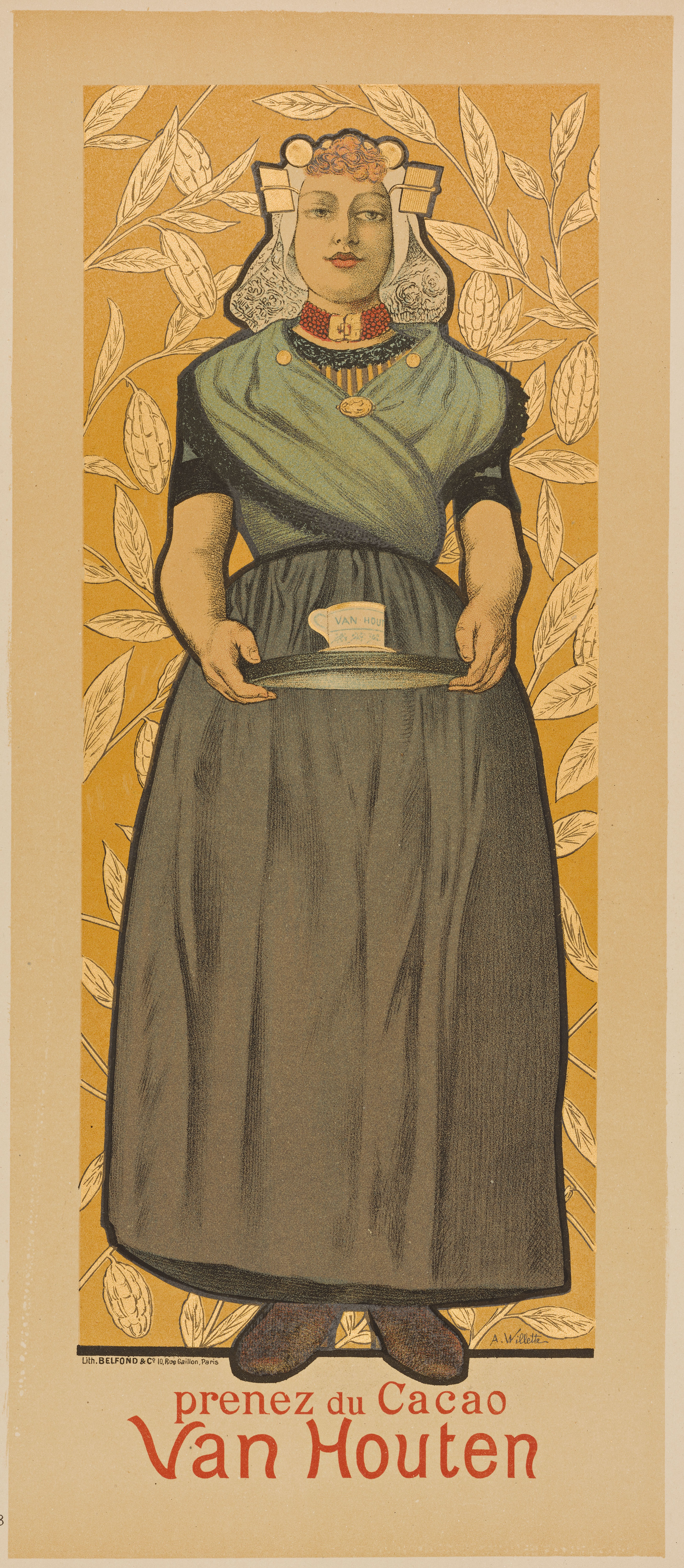
Cacao Van Houten

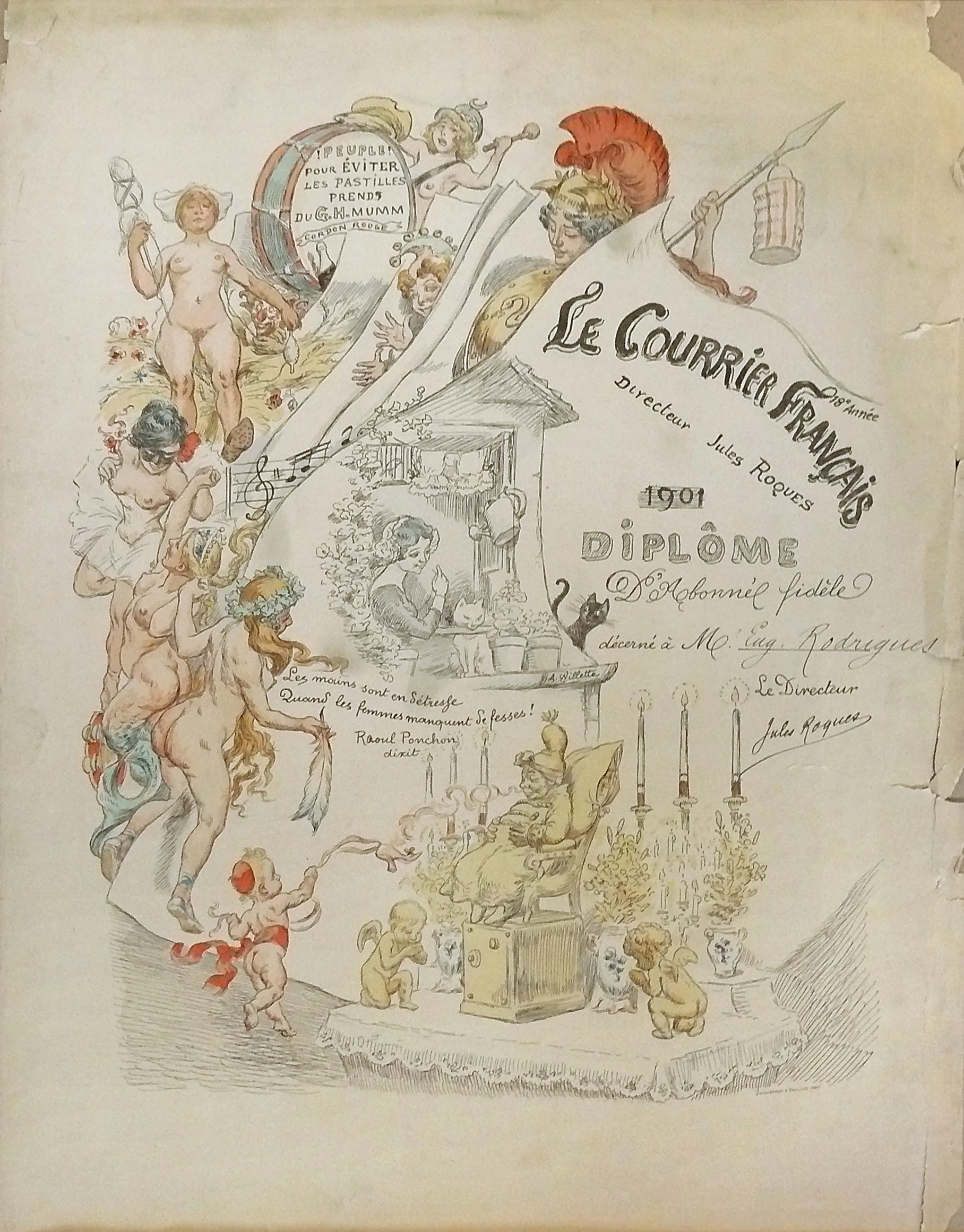
"Diploma" for a loyal subscriber to Le Courrier Français

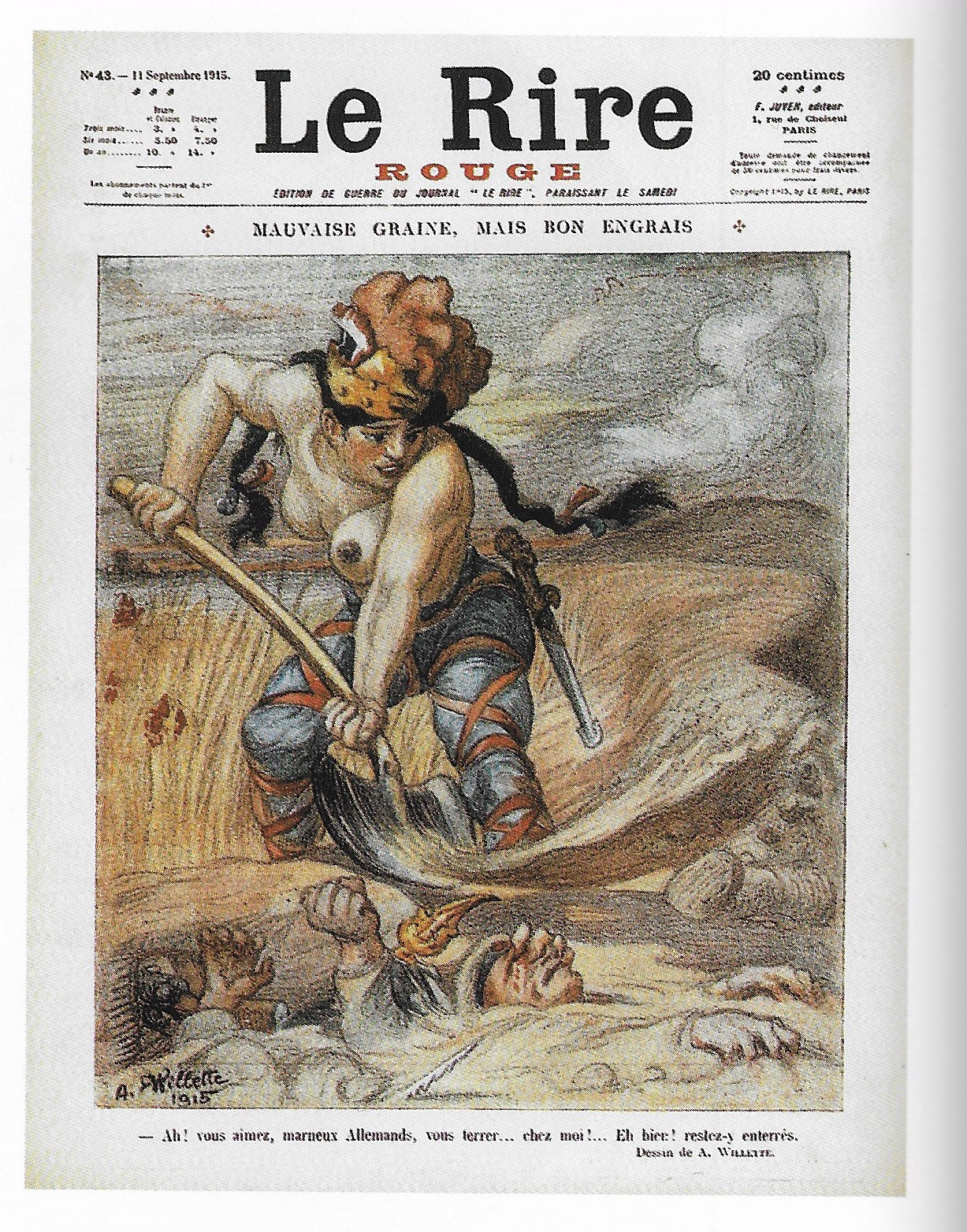
Cover of Le Rire Rouge. #43

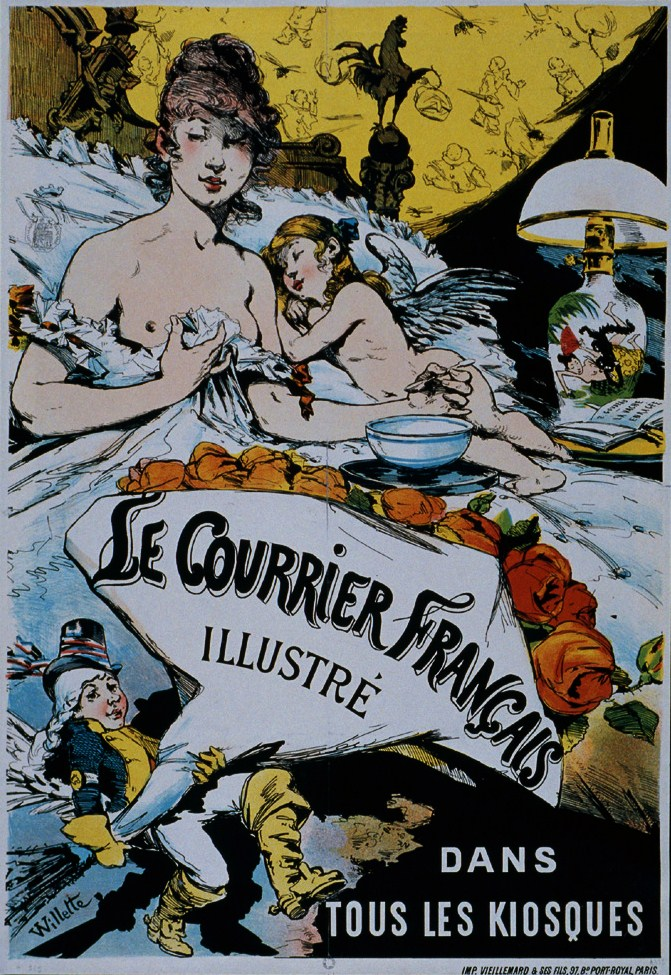
Poster for Le Courrier Français

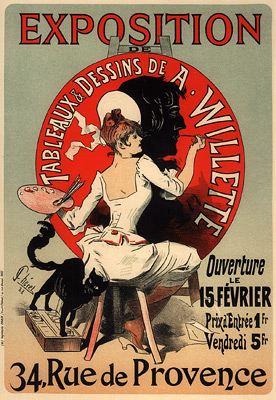
Exposition of works by Willete
