= Melandri =

Melandri is an Italian surname. Notable people with the surname include:

- Francesca Melandri (born 1964), Italian novelist and filmmaker
- Giovanna Melandri (born 1962), Italian politician
- Lea Melandri (born 1941), Italian scholar and writer
- Marco Melandri (born 1982), Italian MotoGP road racer
