= Hombres (poetry collection) =

Collection of erotic poetry by Paul Verlaine

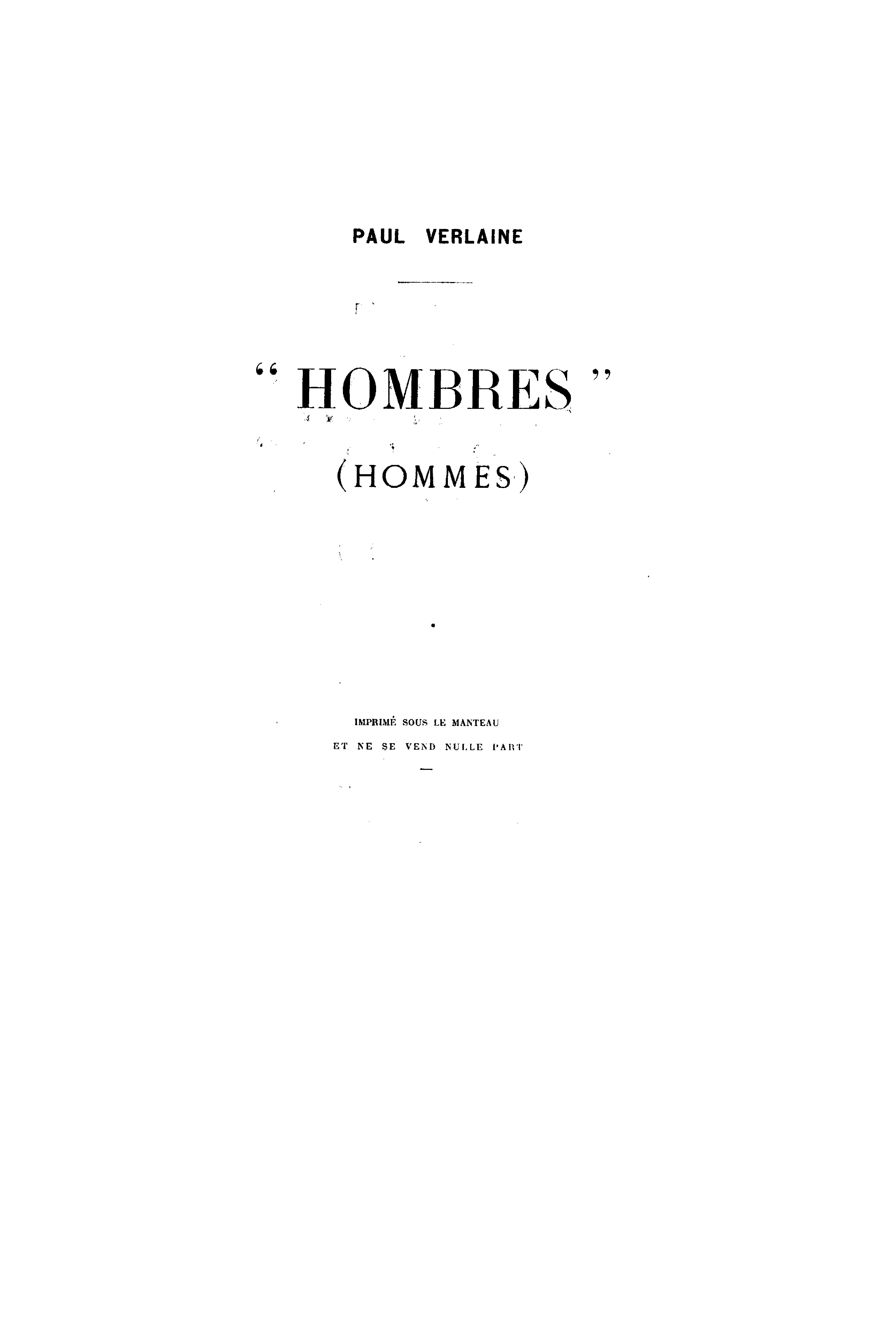

Hombres is a collection of erotic poetry by Paul Verlaine written sometime between 1887 and 1891, with the exception of "Dizain ingénue" and "Le Sonnet du trou du cul". The collection was originally hand-written and distributed by Verlaine, himself. Hombres includes "The Sonnet to an Asshole" (French: Le Sonnet du trou du cul), an erotic poem co-written by Arthur Rimbaud in 1871.

Hombres is the third and final collection of poetry that comprises Verlaine's Erotic Trilogy, after Les Amies and Femmes.

== History ==
On March 19, 1892, Verlaine sold a copy of Hombres to editor Léon Vanier that he had hand written on paper from the Assistance Publique Hospital, where he spent 17 months between 1889 and 1890. The manuscript was 20 pages long with approximately 400 lines of poetry.

The first official copy was published in 1903, after Verlaine's death, by Albert Messein, Vanier's successor at the publishing house on 19, Quai Saint-Michel. This edition was neither dated nor sourced, due to French censure, and was marked as being "printed illicitly and sold nowhere".

== Style ==
Much of Hombres is written in French alexandrine verse. Some poems, such as "VII" are octosyllabic, while others explore various metric patterns. True to Verlaine's poetic oeuvre, all poems in Hombres are written in verse, with deliberate rhyme and rhythmic structures.

== Themes ==
The subject matter of Hombres is homosexual eroticism. Several poems compare men and women as lovers, with the intent of celebrating both sexual relations and love between men. Throughout Hombres, the anus is a recurring image of beauty and pleasure. "III, Balandie I" describes it as a "small heart, with the point in the air", while poem "VIII" describes its odor as "merry enough". Other poems focus on the penis, such as in "IV, Balandie II", a poem that begins with the line: "Head, supreme point of my master’s being…". The collection ends with "The Sonnet to an Asshole", a pastiche of Albert Mérat's poetry in L’Idole, a compilation of poems that glorify different parts of a woman's body.

== Contents ==
- I
- II Mille e Tre
- III Balanide I
- IV Balanide II
- V Sur une statue de Ganymède
- VI Rendez-Vous
- VII
- VIII
- IX
- X
- XI
- XII
- XIII Dizain ingénu (1860)
- XIV
- Le Sonnet du trou du cul (by Paul Verlaine and Arthur Rimbaud)
