= Cahier de Douai =

Poetry manuscript by Arthur Rimbaud

The Cahiers de Douai ("Douai notebooks") is one of the names—along with Recueil de Douai, Dossier de Douai and Recueil Demeny—by which scholars have designated a group of twenty-two poems written by Arthur Rimbaud in his adolescence. In the course of two trips to the city of Douai in September and October 1870, Rimbaud gave the copies to Paul Demeny, director of a literary magazine. In June 1871, doubtless vexed that Demeny had not published them, he asked Demeny to burn the manuscripts. However, Demeny did not respect Rimbaud's wish and preferred to sell them.

They were finally published in 1891, alongside other poems, by Léon Genonceaux in a volume entitled Reliquaire, poésies. This collection is the only one to contain Rimbaud's very first known writings: it contains love poems like Première soirée, Rêvé pour l'hiver, politically charged pieces such as Rages de Césars, Le Mal, and Les Éffarés, and works of social satire like À la musique and L'Éclatante Victoire de Sarrebrück.

== Name ==
The naming of this set of twenty-two poems and the question of whether they form a cohesive collection has given rise to a longstanding critical debate. Long called the recueil Demeny ("Demeny collection"), the term used by Bouillane de Lacoste in his 1939 critical edition of Rimbaud's Poésies, it is also called "cahier de Douai" or "recueil de Douai."

For certain critics, such as Pierre Brunel, this group of poems constitutes a true effort towards a collection on Rimbaud's part. For others, like David Ducoffre, this dossier of poems without a title does not constitute a cohesive collection, for which reason Alain Bardel proposes to call it the "Dossier de Douai."

== Composition ==
These twenty-two poems were seemingly written between March and October 1870 and are divided into two sheafs, of fifteen and seven poems respectively. Rimbaud did not include a table of contents. Pierre Brunel posited in 1983 that this omission was only due to a lack of time, and that "it's easy to do it for him" as follows:

Premier cahier: "Première soirée," "Sensation," "Le Forgeron," "Soleil et Chair," "Ophélie," "Bal des pendus," "Le Châtiment de Tartufe," "Vénus anadyomène," "Les Reparties de Nina," "À la musique," "Les Effarés," "Roman," "Morts de Quatre-vingt-douze et de Quatre-vingt-treize…," "Le Mal," "Rages de Césars."

Deuxième cahier: "Rêvé pour l'hiver," "Le Dormeur du val," "Au Cabaret-Vert," "La Maline," "L'Éclatante Victoire de Sarrebrück," "Le Buffet," "Ma Bohême."

Steve Murphy, in a 1996 article, contests this ordering, which was found for the first time in a 1919 facsimile edition, and which he attributes to Paterne Berrichon. Having observed the manuscript kept at the British Library, he notes that the order in the volume as bound before 1914 by the collector Pierre Dauze, was the same as the order in the 1891 Reliquaire. On this basis he proposes that the earlier ordering be restored. Pierre Brunel, convinced by this argument, decided on the following table of contents in his 1999 edition of Rimbaud's Œuvres complètes:

First cahier

1. "Les Reparties de Nina" ("Nina's Replies")
2. "Vénus anadyomène" ("Venus Anadyomene")
3. "Morts de Quatre-vingt-douze et de Quatre-vingt-treize…" ("Dead of 'Ninety-two and 'Ninety-three...")
4. "Première soirée" ("First Evening")
5. "Sensation"
6. "Bal des pendus" ("Hanged Men's Ball")
7. "Les Effarés"
8. "Roman" ("Romance")
9. "Rages de Césars" ("Rages of Caesars")
10. "Le Mal" ("Evil")
11. "Ophélie" ("Ophelia")
12. "Le Châtiment de Tartufe" ("Tartuffe's Punishment")
13. "À la Musique" ("To Music")
14. "Le Forgeron" ("The Blacksmith")
15. "Soleil et Chair" ("Sun and Flesh")

Second cahier

1. "Le Dormeur du val" ("The Sleeper in the Valley")
2. "Au Cabaret vert" ("At the Green Inn")
3. "La Maline" ("The Sly Girl"
4. "L'éclatante victoire de Sarrebrück" ("The Dazzling Victory of Sarrebruck")
5. "Rêvé pour l'hiver" ("A Dream for Winter")
6. "Le buffet" ("The Cupboard")
7. "Ma Bohème"

== History of the manuscript ==
After running away from home for the first time from 29 August to 5 September 1870, Rimbaud was picked up by his professor of rhetoric, Georges Izambard. He was boarded at Douai for fifteen days at the home of Izambard's aunts, the demoiselles Gindre. On 26 September 1870, Rimbaud gave a first sheaf of fifteen poems to the Douai publisher Paul Demeny. He profited from another trip to Douai in October, during a second flight from home during the Franco-Prussian War, to deliver seven new sonnets to Demeny. He wrote to Demeny later: "I want you to burn––and I believe you will respect my will as if I were dead––burn all the verses that I was foolish enough to give you during my trip to Douai." Demeny did no such thing. Five poems by Rimbaud, Roman, Rages de Césars, Le Mal, Le Châtiment de Tartufe, and Le Dormeur du val survive only because of this decision.

Demeny sold the poems to Rodolphe Darzens, the first biographer of the poet (who did not know Rimbaud in person). The collection then came into the possession of the publisher Léon Genonceaux, the collector Pierre Dauze, and Stefan Zweig, who bought the two sheafs at auction in 1914 and kept them until his death in 1942 in Petrópolis in Brazil. In 1985, Zweig's in-laws donated them to the British Library in London, where they have been kept ever since.

The poems contained in the cahiers were published for the first time in 1891, in Reliquaire, poésies. Facsimiles of the manuscripts were published in 1919, in the collection Manuscrits des maîtres ("Manuscripts of the Masters") edited by the bookseller Albert Messein, under the title of Poésies.

== Bibliography ==
- Pierre Brunel, « Le recueil Demeny », dans Arthur Rimbaud, Poésies complètes 1870–1872, Librairie générale française, 1998 (ISBN 978-2-253-09635-1), p. 20–26
- Brunel, Pierre (1999). Rimbaud. Œuvres complètes. La Pochothèque. Librairie générale française. ISBN 2-253-13250-0..
- Jeancolas, Claude (2004). Arthur Rimbaud. L'Œuvre intégrale manuscrite. Vol. III. Éditions Textuel.
- Ducoffre, David (19 July 2010). "La Légende du Recueil Demeny". Rimbaud ivre, blog de Jacques Bienvenu.
