= Vitalie Rimbaud (1858–1875) =

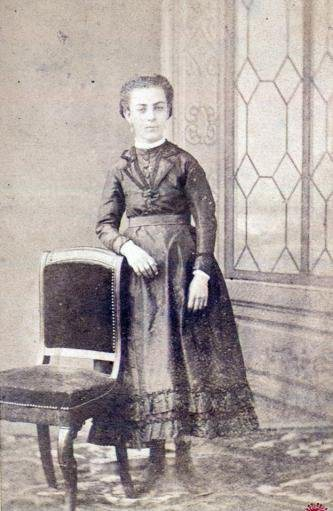
Vitalie Rimbaud – the poet's sister – in December 1873. Photographer: Vassogne, Charleville

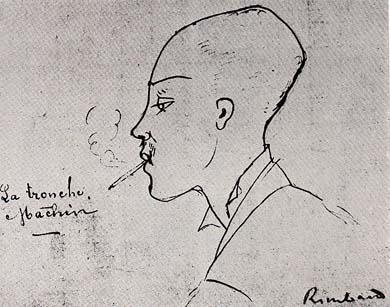
Arthur Rimbaud – his head shaved in mourning - in mid-December 1875 by Ernest Delahaye.

Vitalie Rimbaud (born Jeanne Rosalie Vitalie Rimbaud; 15 June 1858 in Charleville – 18 December 1875 in Charleville) was the elder of the two surviving sisters of Arthur Rimbaud.

== Biography ==
Vitalie was the daughter of Marie Catherine Vitalie Cuif and Frédéric Rimbaud. The latter left the marital home in 1860, leaving his wife with four young children: Frédéric was seven, Arthur six, Vitalie two and Isabelle eight months. This did not include the oldest sister Victorine-Pauline-Vitalie, who had died at the age of a few weeks in 1857.

Vitalie grew up under the thumb of an authoritarian and conservative mother who provided a strict education based on Christian morality. In contrast to her brothers, Frédéric and Arthur, who attended the Institut Rossat, a private secular school with an excellent reputation, Vitalie boarded with the nuns of the Sépuchrine Convent, in the Place du Sépulcre (nowadays the Place Jacques Félix). "At the age of 15, Vitalie Rimbaud had the light skin, dark chestnut hair, and blue eyes of her brother Arthur".

Vitalie died on 18 December 1875, aged 17, from tubercular synovitis. Arthur Rimbaud attended her funeral with his head shaved, a sign of mourning.

She kept a private diary and wrote poetry. Her writings express fragility but do not reflect the permanent revolt that characterises those of her brother Arthur.

== Publications ==
- Journal de Vitalie, published by the "Musée-Bibliothèque Arthur Rimbaud", Charleville-Mézières.
