= Izambard =

Izambard is a French surname. Notable people with the surname include:

- Georges Izambard (1848–1931), French school teacher
- Sébastien Izambard (born 1973), French singer, composer, and record producer
