= FVW =

FVW may refer to:

- FVW, abbreviation for German Fremdenverkehrswirtschaft (tourism economy), used in Éditions FVW, publisher of Claude Jeancolas
- FVW, abbreviation for Würzburger FV, German sports club
- Fox Valley and Western Ltd., a railroad in Wisconsin
