= Isabelle Rimbaud =

French writer and sister of Arthur Rimbaud

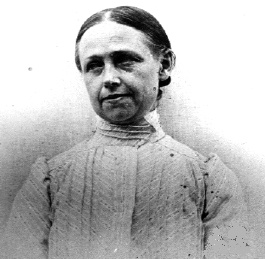
- c. 1900
- Born: 1 June 1860; Charleville-Mézières, France
- Died: 20 June 1917 (aged 57); Neuilly-sur-Seine, France
- Spouse: Paterne Berrichon (m. 1897)
- Parents: Frédéric Rimbaud (father); Vitalie Rimbaud (mother)
- Relatives: Arthur Rimbaud (brother); Vitalie Rimbaud (sister)

Isabelle Rimbaud (1 June 1860 – 20 June 1917) was the youngest sister of Arthur Rimbaud and the wife of Pierre-Eugène Dufour (1855-1922), better known as Paterne Berrichon. She inherited Arthur Rimbaud's estate after his death in 1891 and became his literary executor.

== Biography ==
Isabelle Rimbaud was the youngest daughter of Marie Catherine Vitalie Cuif and Frédéric Rimbaud, who left the marital home leaving his wife with four small children. These were Frédéric at seven years, Arthur at six, Vitalie at two and Isabelle at eight months. Isabelle, like her siblings, grew up under the heel of an authoritarian and conservative mother who instilled in her strict principles based on Christian morality.

Among the known letters of Arthur Rimbaud, several were exchanged with his sister Isabelle. When Arthur Rimbaud returned to Marseilles on 23 August 1891, Isabelle went with him. In her letters to her mother, she described the last weeks of Arthur Rimbaud's life. She wrote down her brother's last letter [dictated] on 9 November 1891 and added his last words before the midday sun the following day.

She witnessed his great sufferings and was present during his death throes on the night of 9/10 November 1891. In a letter to her mother she wrote: "This is no longer a poor outcast who is going to die besides me. He is fair, a saint, a martyr, one of God's elect". She learned only at the death of her brother that he had written poems: "Without ever having read them, I know his works".

Isabelle was the last person to have sketched her dying brother.

She married, in 1897, Paterne Berrichon. They both strove to be the guardians of the poet's good name. She died on 20 June 1917, aged 57, of knee cancer (as her brother Arthur) in Neuilly-sur-Seine, France.

== Gallery ==
Isabelle Rimbaud

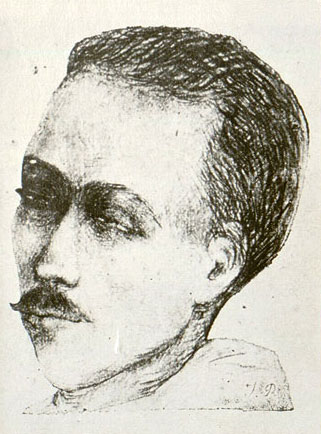
Arthur Rimbaud dying, drawn by Isabelle Rimbaud.

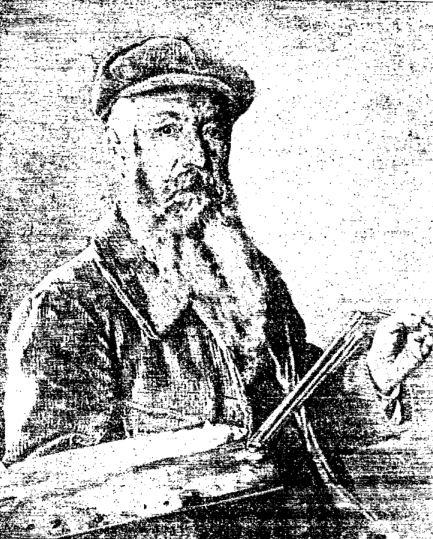
Berrichon: self-portrait, from La Plume 1904.

== Publications ==
- Rimbaud, Isabelle (1921), Reliques: Rimbaud mourant, Mon frère Arthur, Le Dernier voyage de Rimbaud, Rimbaud catholique (in French), Paris: Mercure de France
- Rimbaud, Isabelle (2009), Rimbaud mourant (in French), Paris: Manucius, ISBN 978-2-84578-104-7
- Rimbaud, Isabelle (2015), Mon frère Arthur, Ab initio (in French), Paris: Mazeto Square, ISBN 978-2-919229-05-5
