= Arthur Rimbaud =

French poet (1854–1891)

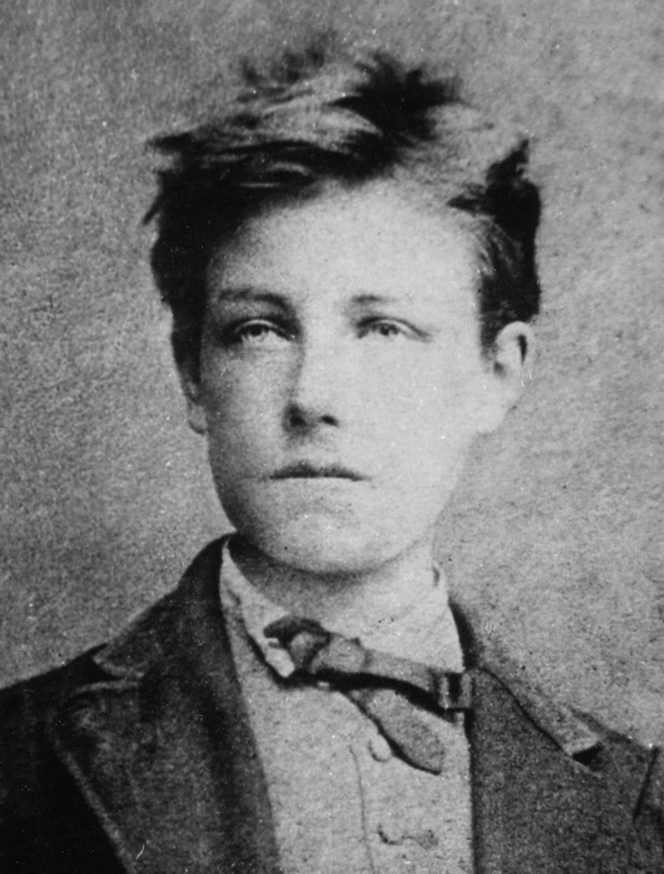
- Rimbaud at 17 by Étienne Carjat
- Born: Jean Nicolas Arthur Rimbaud; 20 October 1854; Charleville, Ardennes, French Empire
- Died: 10 November 1891 (aged 37); Marseille, Bouches-du-Rhône, French Republic
- Occupation: Poet
- Partner: Paul Verlaine (1871–1873)
- Parents: Frédéric Rimbaud (father); Marie Catherine Vitalie Rimbaud (mother)
- Relatives: Vitalie Rimbaud (sister); Isabelle Rimbaud (sister)
- Writing career
- Language: French
- Period: 1870–1875 (major creative period)
- Notable works: The Drunken Boat (1871); A Season in Hell (1873); Illuminations (1873–1875)
- Movement: Symbolism

Jean Nicolas Arthur Rimbaud (UK: /ˈræ̃boʊ/, US: /ræmˈboʊ/; French: [ʒɑ̃ nikɔla aʁtyʁ ʁɛ̃bo]; 20 October 1854 – 10 November 1891) was a French poet known for his transgressive and surreal themes and for his influence on modern literature and arts, prefiguring surrealism.

Born in Charleville, he started writing at a very young age and excelled as a student, but abandoned his formal education in his teenage years to run away to Paris amidst the Franco-Prussian War. During his late adolescence and early adulthood, he produced the bulk of his literary output. Rimbaud completely stopped writing literature at age 20 after assembling his last major work, Illuminations.

Rimbaud was a libertine and a restless soul, having engaged in a hectic, sometimes violent romantic relationship with fellow poet Paul Verlaine, which lasted nearly two years. After his retirement as a writer, he travelled extensively on three continents as a merchant and explorer until his death from cancer just after his thirty-seventh birthday. As a poet, Rimbaud is well known for his contributions to symbolism and, among other works, for A Season in Hell, a precursor to modernist literature.

== Life ==
=== Family and childhood (1854–1861) ===
Arthur Rimbaud was born in the provincial town of Charleville (now part of Charleville-Mézières) in the Ardennes department in northeastern France. He was the second child of Frédéric Rimbaud (7 October 1814 – 16 November 1878) and Marie Catherine Vitalie Rimbaud (née Cuif; 10 March 1825 – 16 November 1907).

Rimbaud's father, a Burgundian of Provençal heritage, was an infantry captain who had risen from the ranks; he had spent much of his army career abroad. He participated in the conquest of Algeria from 1844 to 1850, and in 1854 was awarded the Legion of Honor "by Imperial decree". Captain Rimbaud was described as "good-tempered, easy-going and generous," with the long moustache and goatee of a Chasseur officer.

In October 1852, Captain Rimbaud, then aged 38, was transferred to Mézières where he met Vitalie Cuif, 11 years his junior, while on a Sunday stroll. She came from a "solidly established Ardennais family", but one with its share of bohemians; two of her brothers were alcoholics. Her personality was the "exact opposite" of Captain Rimbaud's; she was reportedly narrowminded, "stingy and... completely lacking in a sense of humour". When Charles Houin, an early biographer, interviewed her, he found her "withdrawn, stubborn and taciturn". Arthur Rimbaud's private names for her included "Mouth of Darkness" (bouche d'ombre) and the anglicism La Mother.

On 8 February 1853, Captain Rimbaud and Vitalie Cuif married; their first-born, Jean Nicolas Frédéric ("Frédéric"), arrived nine months later on 2 November. The next year, on 20 October 1854, Jean Nicolas Arthur ("Arthur") was born. Three more children followed: Victorine-Pauline-Vitalie on 4 June 1857 (who died a few weeks later), Jeanne-Rosalie-Vitalie ("Vitalie") on 15 June 1858 and, finally, Frédérique Marie Isabelle ("Isabelle") on 1 June 1860.

Though the marriage lasted seven years, Captain Rimbaud lived continuously in the matrimonial home for less than three months, from February to May 1853. The rest of the time his military postings—including active service in the Crimean War and the Sardinian Campaign (with medals earned in both)—meant he returned home to Charleville only when on leave. He was not at home for his children's births, nor their baptisms. Isabelle's birth in 1860 must have been the last straw, as after this Captain Rimbaud stopped returning home on leave altogether. Though they never divorced, the separation was complete; thereafter Mme Rimbaud let herself be known as "widow Rimbaud" and Captain Rimbaud would describe himself as a widower. Neither the captain nor his children showed the slightest interest in re-establishing contact.

=== Schooling and teen years (1861–1871) ===
Fearing her children were being over-influenced by the neighbouring children of the poor, Mme Rimbaud moved her family to the Cours d'Orléans in 1862. This was a better neighbourhood, and the boys, now aged nine and eight, who had been taught at home by their mother, were now sent to the Pension Rossat, an old but well-regarded school. Throughout the five years that they attended the school, however, their formidable mother still imposed her will upon them, pushing them for scholastic success. She would punish her sons by making them learn a hundred lines of Latin verse by heart, and further punish any mistakes by depriving them of meals. When Arthur was nine, he wrote a 700-word essay objecting to his having to learn Latin in school. Vigorously condemning a classical education as a mere gateway to a salaried position, he wrote repeatedly, "I will be a rentier". Arthur disliked schoolwork and resented his mother's constant supervision; the children were not allowed out of their mother's sight, and until they were fifteen and sixteen respectively, she would walk them home from school.

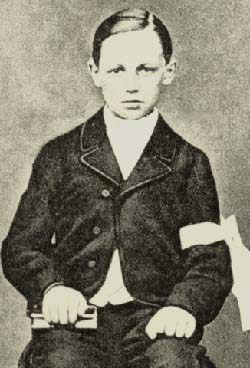
Rimbaud on the day of his First Communion

As a boy, Arthur Rimbaud was small and pale with light brown hair, and eyes that his lifelong best friend, Ernest Delahaye, described as "pale blue irradiated with dark blue—the loveliest eyes I've seen". An ardent Catholic like his mother, he had his First Communion when he was eleven. His piety earned him the schoolyard nickname "sale petit Cagot". That same year, he and his brother were sent to the Collège de Charleville. Up to then, his reading had been largely confined to the Bible, though he had also enjoyed fairy tales and adventure stories, such as the novels of James Fenimore Cooper and Gustave Aimard. At the Collège he became a highly successful student, heading his class in all subjects except mathematics and the sciences; his schoolmasters remarked upon his ability to absorb great quantities of material. He won eight first prizes in the French academic competitions in 1869, including the prize for Religious Education, and the following year won seven first prizes.

Hoping for a brilliant academic career for her second son, Mme Rimbaud hired a private tutor for Arthur when he reached the third grade. Father Ariste Lhéritier succeeded in sparking in the young scholar a love of Greek, Latin and French classical literature, and was the first to encourage the boy to write original verse, in both French and Latin. Rimbaud's first poem to appear in print was "Les Étrennes des orphelins" ("The Orphans' New Year's Gifts"), which was published in the 2 January 1870 issue of La Revue pour tous; he was just 15.

Two weeks later, a new teacher of rhetoric, the 22-year-old Georges Izambard, started at the Collège de Charleville. Izambard became Rimbaud's mentor, and soon a close friendship formed between teacher and student, with Rimbaud seeing Izambard as a kind of elder brother. At the age of 15, Rimbaud was showing maturity as a poet; the first poem he showed Izambard, "Ophélie", would later be included in anthologies, and is often regarded as one of Rimbaud's three or four best poems. On 4 May 1870, Rimbaud's mother wrote to Izambard to object to his having given Rimbaud Victor Hugo's Les Misérables to read, as she thought the book dangerous to the morals of a child.

The Franco-Prussian War, between Napoleon III's Second French Empire and the Kingdom of Prussia, broke out on 19 July 1870. Five days later, Izambard left Charleville for the summer to stay with his three aunts – the Misses Gindre – in Douai. In the meantime, preparations for war continued and the Collège de Charleville became a military hospital. By the end of August, with the countryside in turmoil, Rimbaud was bored and restless. In search of adventure he ran away by train to Paris without funds for his ticket. On arrival at the Gare du Nord, he was arrested and locked up in Mazas Prison to await trial for fare evasion and vagrancy. On 5 September, Rimbaud wrote a desperate letter to Izambard, who arranged with the prison governor that Rimbaud be released into his care. As hostilities were continuing, he stayed with the Misses Gindre in Douai until he could be returned to Charleville. Rimbaud took the opportunity to give Paul Demeny, a poet who directed a literary review in Douai, the first of what scholars now refer to as the Cahiers de Douai ("Douai Notebooks"). This was a loose sheaf of fifteen poems, including "Ophélie," "Soleil et chair," and "Première soirée." Izambard finally handed Rimbaud over to Mme Rimbaud on 27 September 1870 (his mother reportedly slapped him in the face and admonished Izambard), but he was at home for only ten days before running away again. During this second absence from home, he delivered Demeny the second Cahier de Douai, which contains seven sonnets, including "Ma Bohême," "Le Dormeur du val," and "Rêvé pour l'hiver." He would later write to Demeny asking him to burn all the poems.

From late October 1870, Rimbaud's behaviour became openly provocative; he drank alcohol, spoke rudely, composed scatological poems, stole books from local shops, and abandoned his characteristically neat appearance by allowing his hair to grow long.

At the end of February 1871 he ran away again and made his way to Paris, which was now encircled and partially occupied by German troops. As can be seen from a letter to Izambard, he browsed in bookshops but set off home on foot after a few days. The validity of the claim that Rimbaud returned to the capital after the proclamation of the Paris Commune on March 18, 1871, and that he took part as a guerrilla in the defense of the Commune is uncertain. His sympathies for the Commune are, however, reflected in several poems from this period. According to Jenny Longuet, he may have briefly met Karl Marx during the days of the Commune.

On 13 and 15 May 1871, he wrote letters (later called the lettres du voyant by scholars, meaning "letters of the seer"), to Izambard and Paul Demeny respectively, about his method for attaining poetical transcendence or visionary power through a "long, immense and rational derangement of all the senses" (to Demeny). "The sufferings are enormous, but one must be strong, be born a poet, and I have recognized myself as a poet" (to Izambard).

=== Life with Verlaine (1871–1875) ===
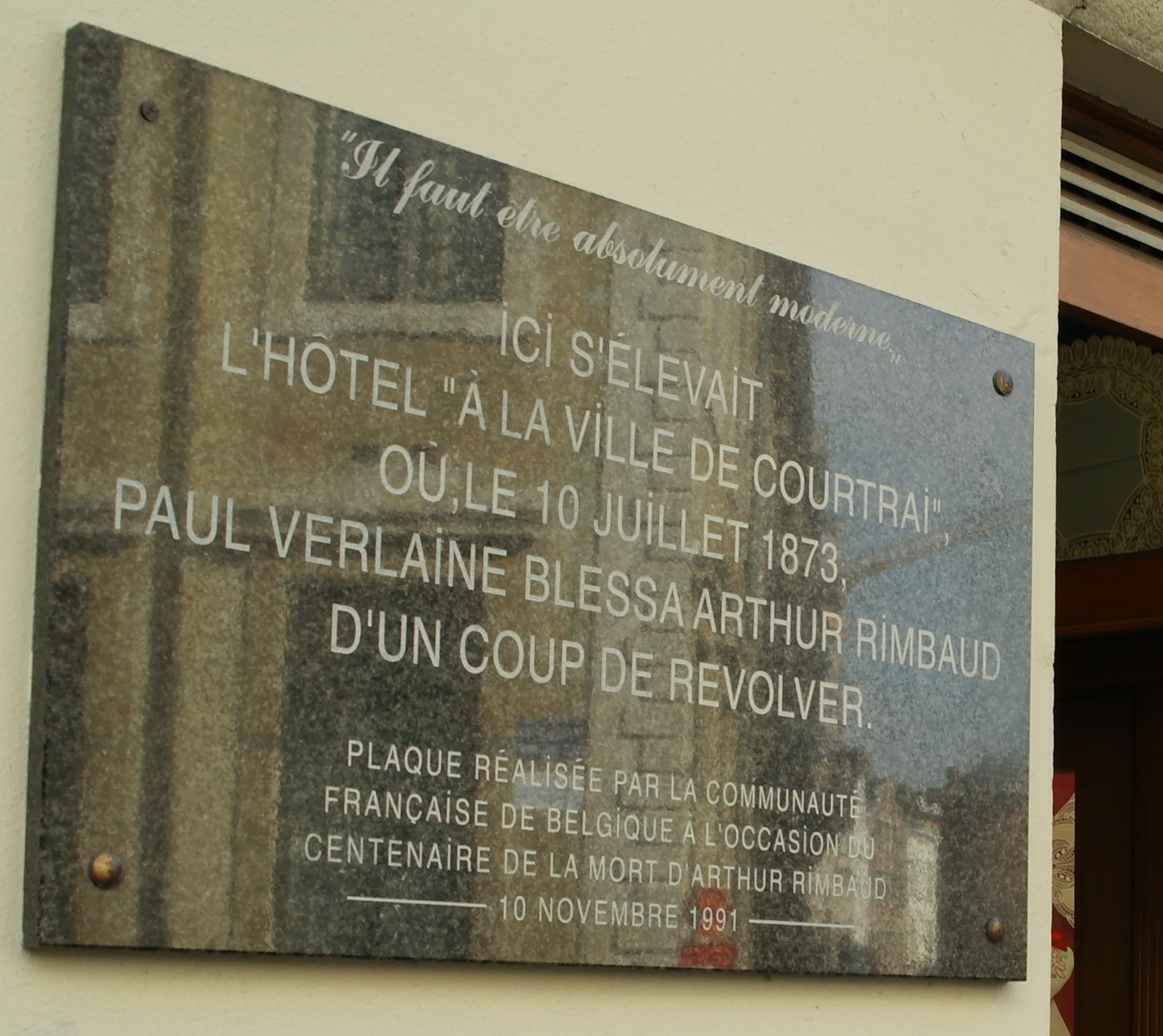
Plaque erected on the centenary of Rimbaud's death at the place where he was shot and wounded by Verlaine in Brussels

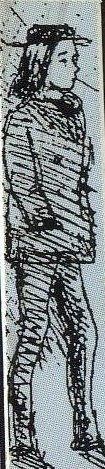
Caricature of Rimbaud drawn by Verlaine in 1872

Rimbaud wrote to several famous poets but received either no reply or a disappointing mere acknowledgement (as from Théodore de Banville), so his friend, office employee Charles Auguste Bretagne, advised him to write to Paul Verlaine, a rising poet (and future leader of the Symbolist movement) who had published two well-regarded collections. Rimbaud sent Verlaine two letters with several of his poems, including the hypnotic, finally shocking "Le Dormeur du Val" ("The Sleeper in the Valley"), in which Nature is called upon to comfort an apparently sleeping soldier. Verlaine was intrigued by Rimbaud, and replied, "Come, dear great soul. We await you; we desire you", sending him a one-way ticket to Paris. Rimbaud arrived in late September 1871 and resided briefly in Verlaine's home. Verlaine's wife, Mathilde Mauté, was seventeen years old and pregnant, and Verlaine had recently left his job and started drinking. In later published recollections of his first sight of Rimbaud at the age of sixteen, Verlaine described him as having "the real head of a child, chubby and fresh, on a big, bony, rather clumsy body of a still-growing adolescent", with a "very strong Ardennes accent that was almost a dialect". His voice had "highs and lows as if it were breaking".

Rimbaud and Verlaine soon began a brief and torrid affair. They led a wild, vagabond-like life spiced by absinthe, opium, and hashish. The Parisian literary coterie was scandalized by Rimbaud, whose behaviour was that of the archetypal enfant terrible, yet throughout this period he continued to write poems. Their stormy relationship eventually brought them to London in September 1872, a period over which Rimbaud would later express regret. During this time, Verlaine abandoned his wife and infant son (both of whom he had abused in his alcoholic rages). In London they lived in considerable poverty in Bloomsbury and in Camden Town, scraping a living mostly from teaching, as well as with an allowance from Verlaine's mother. Rimbaud spent his days in the Reading Room of the British Museum where "heating, lighting, pens and ink were free". The relationship between the two poets grew increasingly bitter, and Verlaine abandoned Rimbaud in London to meet his wife in Brussels.

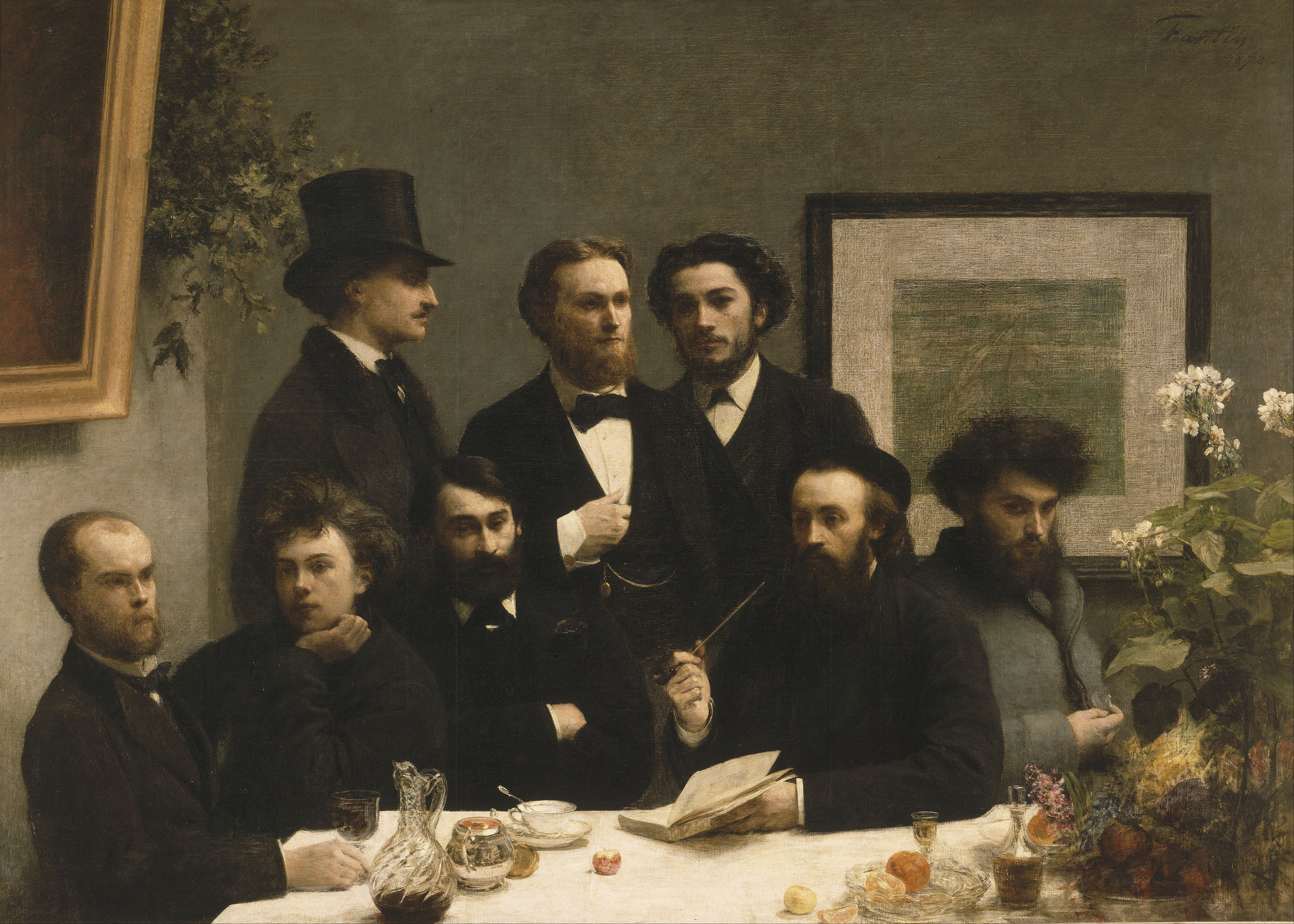
By the table, an 1872 painting by Henri Fantin-Latour. Verlaine is on the far left and Rimbaud is at the second to the left.

Rimbaud was not well-liked at the time, and many people thought of him as dirty and rude. The artist Henri Fantin-Latour wanted to paint first division poets at the 1872 Salon, but they were not available. He had to settle for Rimbaud and Verlaine, who were described as "geniuses of the tavern". The painting, By the table, shows Rimbaud and Verlaine at the end of the table. Other writers, such as Albert Mérat, refused to be painted with Verlaine and Rimbaud, Mérat's reason being that he "would not be painted with pimps and thieves", in reference to Verlaine and Rimbaud; in the painting, Mérat is replaced by a flower vase on the table. Mérat also spread many rumours in the salons that Verlaine and Rimbaud were sleeping together; the spread of those rumours was the commencement of the fall for the two poets, who were trying to build a good reputation for themselves.

In late June 1873, Verlaine returned to Paris alone but quickly began to mourn Rimbaud's absence. On 8 July, he telegraphed Rimbaud, asking him to come to the Grand Hôtel Liégeois in Brussels. The reunion went badly, they argued continuously, and Verlaine took refuge in heavy drinking. On the morning of 10 July, Verlaine bought a revolver and ammunition. About 16:00, "in a drunken rage", he fired two shots at Rimbaud, one of them wounding the 18-year-old in the left wrist.

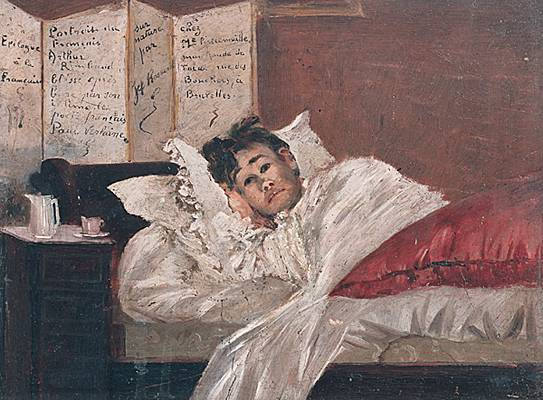
Rimbaud convalescing from his gunshot wound in Brussels (painting by "Jef Rosman").

Rimbaud initially dismissed the wound as superficial but had it dressed at the St-Jean hospital nevertheless. He did not immediately file charges, but decided to leave Brussels. About 20:00, Verlaine and his mother accompanied Rimbaud to the Gare du Midi railway station. On the way, by Rimbaud's account, Verlaine "behaved as if he were insane". Fearing that Verlaine, with a pistol in the pocket, might shoot him again, Rimbaud "ran off" and "begged a policeman to arrest him". Verlaine was charged with attempted murder, then subjected to a humiliating medico-legal examination. He was also interrogated about his correspondence with Rimbaud and the nature of their relationship. The bullet was eventually removed on 17 July and Rimbaud withdrew his complaint. The charges were reduced to wounding with a firearm, and on 8 August 1873, Verlaine was sentenced to two years in prison.

In 1946, the discovery of a painting by an otherwise-unknown "Jef Rosman," depicting Rimbaud's convalescence from his gunshot wound at Brussels, excited the literary world. The painting's legend, written on the paneled screen behind Rimbaud, states that it was painted from life at the home of "M. Pincemaille, tobacco merchant, rue des Bouchers, Brussels." This painting, now at the Arthur Rimbaud Museum in Charleville-Mézières, has been the subject of scrutiny as to its authenticity and the identity of the artist.

Rimbaud returned home to Charleville and completed his prose work Une Saison en Enfer ("A Season in Hell")—still widely regarded as a pioneering example of modern Symbolist writing. In the work, it is widely interpreted that he refers to Verlaine as his "pitiful brother" (frère pitoyable) and the "mad virgin" (vierge folle), and to himself as the "hellish husband" (l'époux infernal), and described their life together as a "domestic farce" (drôle de ménage).

In 1874, he returned to London with the poet Germain Nouveau. They lived together for three months while he put together his groundbreaking Illuminations, a collection of prose poems, although he eventually did not see it through publication (it only got published in 1886, without the author's knowledge).

=== Travels (1875–1880) ===
Rimbaud and Verlaine met for the last time in March 1875, in Stuttgart, after Verlaine's release from prison and his conversion to Catholicism. By then Rimbaud had given up literature in favour of a steady, working life. Stéphane Mallarmé, in a text about Rimbaud from 1896 (after his death), described him as a "meteor, lit by no other reason than his presence, arising alone then vanishing" who had managed to "surgically remove poetry from himself while still alive". (Note: « Éclat, lui, d'un météore, allumé sans motif autre que sa présence, issu seul et s'éteignant. » / « Voici la date mystérieuse, pourtant naturelle, si l'on convient que celui, qui rejette des rêves, par sa faute ou la leur, et s'opère, vivant, de la poésie, ultérieurement ne sait trouver que loin, très loin, un état nouveau. » Complete text on Wikisource.) Albert Camus, in L'homme révolté, although he praised Rimbaud's literary works (particularly his later prose works, Une saison en enfer and Illuminations – "he is the poet of revolt, and the greatest"), wrote a scathing account of his resignation from literature – and revolt itself – in his later life, claiming that there is nothing to admire, nothing noble or even genuinely adventurous, in a man who committed a "spiritual suicide", became a "bourgeois trafficker" and consented to the materialistic order of things.

After studying several languages (German, Italian, Spanish), he went on to travel extensively in Europe, mostly on foot. In May 1876 he enlisted as a soldier in the Dutch Colonial Army to get free passage to Java in the Dutch East Indies (now Indonesia). Four months later he deserted and fled into the jungle. He managed to return incognito to France by ship; as a deserter he would have faced a Dutch firing squad had he been caught.

In December 1878, Rimbaud journeyed to Larnaca in Cyprus, where he worked for a construction company as a stone quarry foreman. In May of the following year he had to leave Cyprus because of a fever, which on his return to France was diagnosed as typhoid.

=== Abyssinia (1880–1891) ===
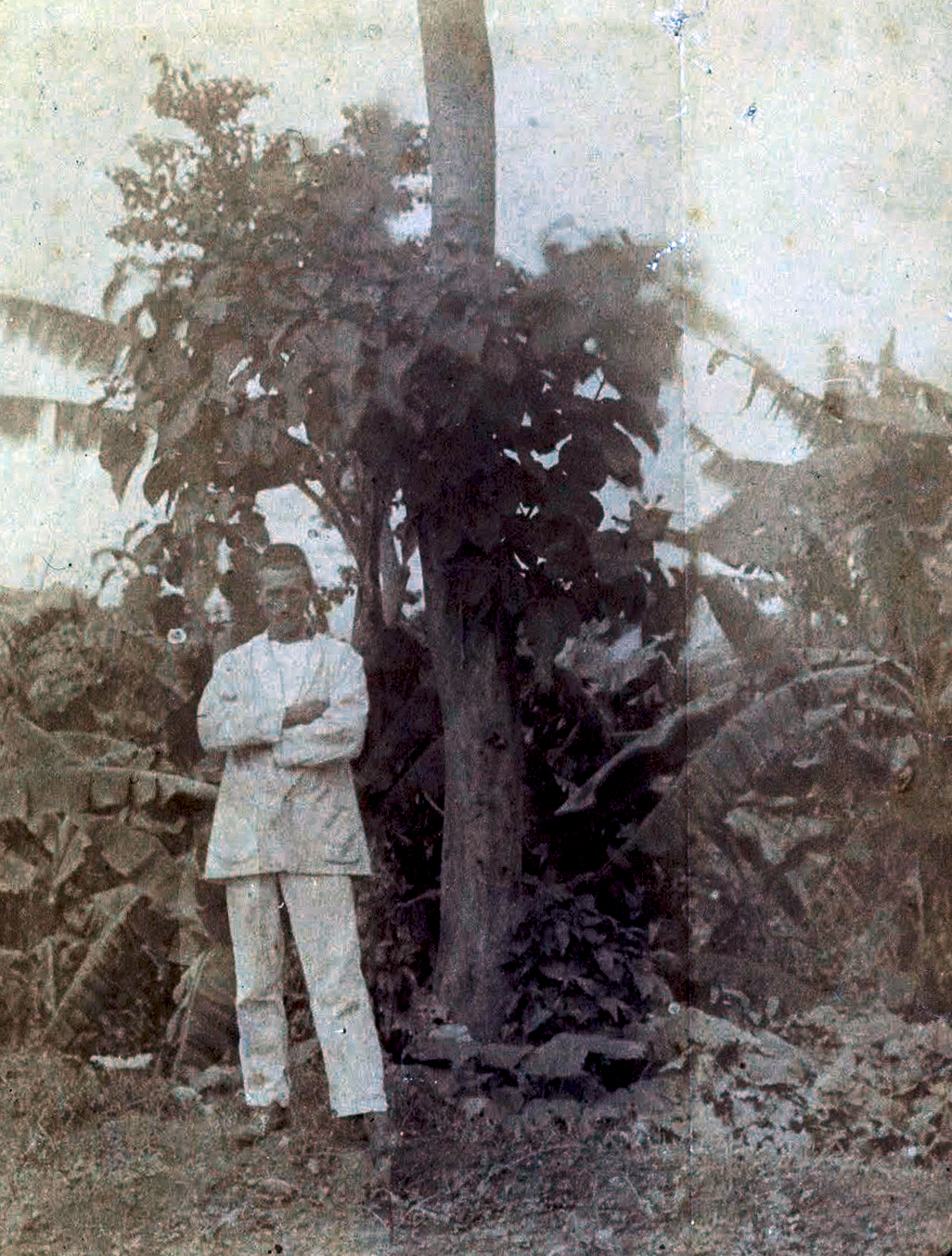
Rimbaud (self-portrait) in Harar, Ethiopia in 1883.

Rimbaud finally settled in Aden, Yemen, in 1880, as a main employee in the Bardey agency, going on to run the firm's agency in Harar, Ethiopia. In 1884, his Report on the Ogaden (based on notes from his assistant Constantin Sotiro) was presented and published by the Société de Géographie in Paris. In the same year he left his job at Bardey's to become a merchant on his own account in Harar, where his commercial dealings included coffee and (generally outdated) firearms.

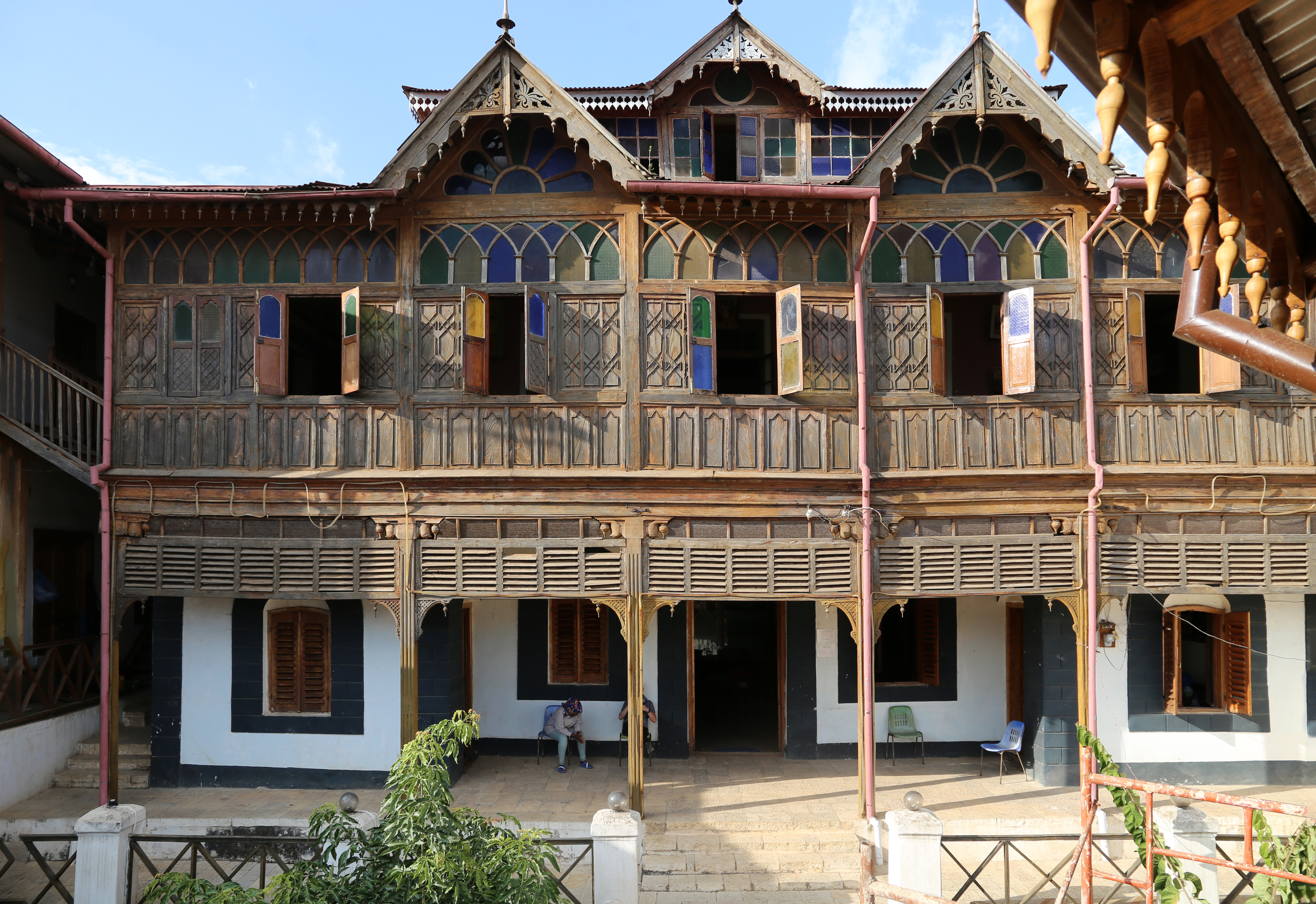
Rimbaud's house in Harar, Ethiopia

At the same time, Rimbaud engaged in exploring and struck up a close friendship with the Governor of Harar, Ras Mekonnen Wolde Mikael Wolde Melekot, father of future emperor Haile Selassie. He maintained friendly relations with the official tutor of the young heir. Rimbaud worked in the coffee trade. "He was, in fact, a pioneer in the business, the first European to oversee the export of the celebrated coffee of Harar from the country where coffee was born. He was only the third European ever to set foot in the city, and the first to do business there".

In 1885, Rimbaud became involved in a major deal to sell old rifles to Menelik II, king of Shewa, at the initiative of French merchant Pierre Labatut. The explorer Paul Soleillet became involved early in 1886. The arms were landed at Tadjoura in February, but could not be moved inland because Léonce Lagarde, governor of the new French administration of Obock and its dependencies, issued an order on 12 April 1886 prohibiting the sale of weapons. When the authorization came through from the consul de France, Labatut fell ill and had to withdraw (he died from cancer soon afterwards), then Soleillet died from embolism on 9 October. When Rimbaud finally reached Shewa, Menelik had just scored a major victory and no longer needed these older weapons, but still took advantage of the situation by negotiating them at a much lower price than expected while also deducting presumed debts from Labatut. The whole ordeal turned out to be a disaster.

In the following years, between 1888 and 1890, Rimbaud established his own store in Harar, but soon got bored and dismayed. He hosted explorer Jules Borrelli and merchant Armand Savouré. In their later testimonies, they both described him as an intelligent man, quiet, sarcastic, secretive about his prior life, living with simplicity, and taking care of his business with accuracy, honesty and firmness.

=== Sickness and death (1891) ===
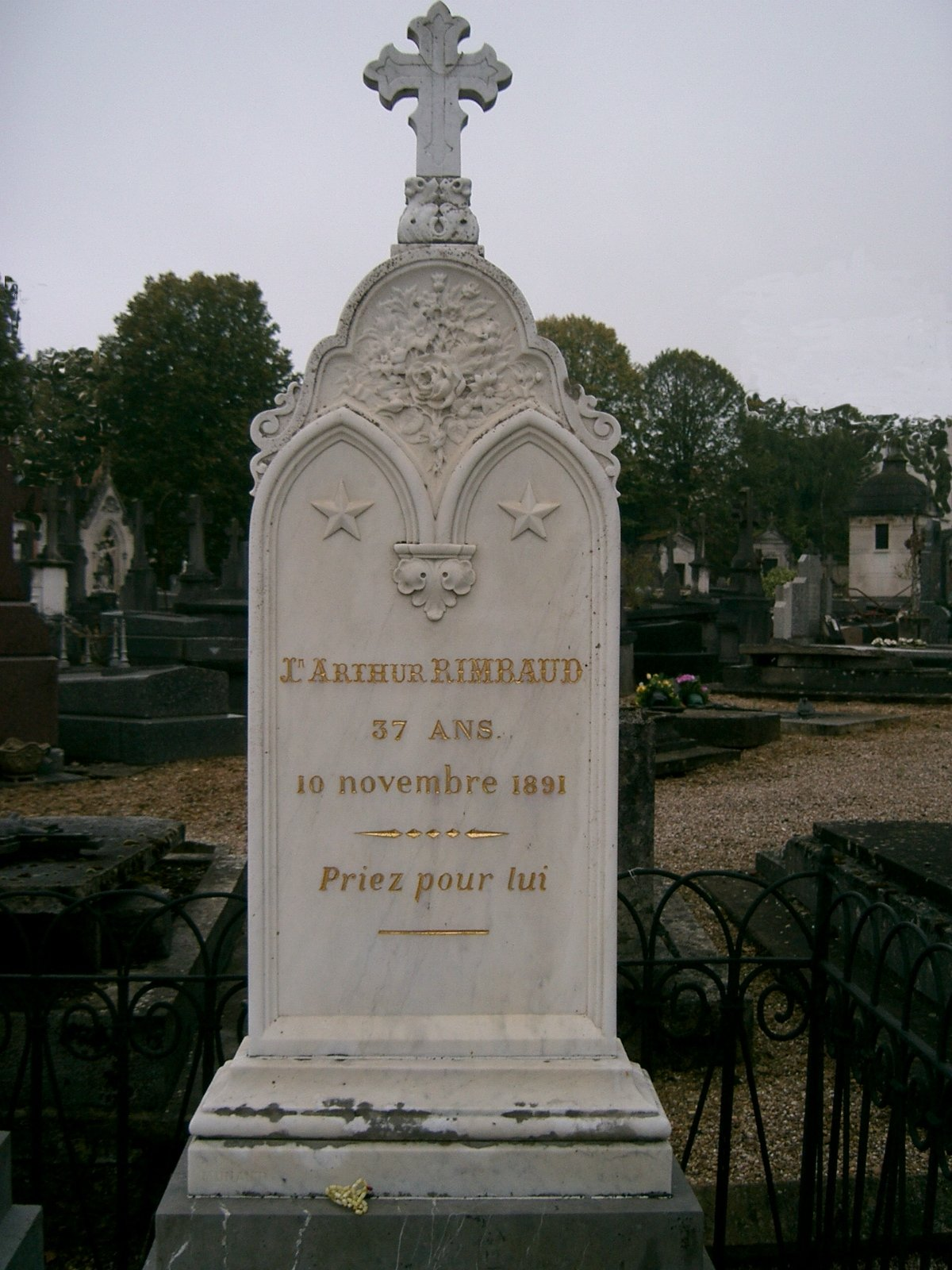
Rimbaud's grave in Charleville. The inscription reads Priez pour lui ("Pray for him").

In February 1891, in Aden, Rimbaud developed what he initially thought was arthritis in his right knee. It failed to respond to treatment, and by March had become so painful that he prepared to return to France for better treatment. Before leaving, Rimbaud consulted a British doctor who mistakenly diagnosed tubercular synovitis, and recommended immediate amputation. Rimbaud remained in Aden until 7 May to set his financial affairs in order, then caught a steamer, L'Amazone, back to France for a 13-day voyage. On arrival in Marseille, he was admitted to the Hôpital de la Conception, where, a week later on 27 May, his right leg was amputated. The post-operative diagnosis was bone cancer—probably osteosarcoma.

After a short stay at the family farm in Roche, from 23 July to 23 August, he attempted to travel back to Africa, but on the way his health deteriorated, and he was re-admitted to the Hôpital de la Conception in Marseille. He spent some time there in great pain, attended by his sister Isabelle. He received the last rites from a priest before dying on 10 November 1891, at the age of 37. The remains were sent across France to his home town and he was buried in Charleville-Mézières. On the 100th anniversary of Rimbaud's birth, Thomas Bernhard delivered a memorial lecture on Rimbaud and described his end:

"On 10 November, at two o'clock in the afternoon, he was dead," noted his sister Isabelle. The priest, shaken by so much reverence for God, administered the last rites. "I have never seen such strong faith," he said. Thanks to Isabelle, Rimbaud was brought to Charleville and buried in its cemetery with great pomp. He still lies there, next to his sister Vitalie, beneath a simple marble monument.

== Poetry ==
The first known poems of Arthur Rimbaud mostly emulated the style of the Parnasse school and other famous contemporary poets like Victor Hugo, although he quickly developed an original approach, both thematically and stylistically (in particular by mixing profane words and ideas with sophisticated verse, as in "Vénus Anadyomène", "Oraison du soir" or "Les chercheuses de poux"). Later on, Rimbaud was prominently inspired by the work of Charles Baudelaire. This inspiration would help him create a style of poetry later labeled as symbolist.

In May 1871, aged 16, Rimbaud wrote two letters explaining his poetic philosophy, commonly called the Lettres du voyant ("Letters of the Seer"). In the first, written 13 May to Izambard, Rimbaud explained:

I'm now making myself as scummy as I can. Why? I want to be a poet, and I'm working at turning myself into a seer. You won't understand any of this, and I'm almost incapable of explaining it to you. The idea is to reach the unknown by the derangement of all the senses. It involves enormous suffering, but one must be strong and be a born poet. It's really not my fault.

The second letter, written on 15 May—before his first trip to Paris—to his friend Paul Demeny, expounded his revolutionary theories about poetry and life, while also denouncing some of the most famous poets that preceded him (reserving a particularly harsh criticism for Alfred de Musset, while holding Charles Baudelaire in high regard, although, according to Rimbaud, his vision was hampered by a too conventional style). Wishing for new poetic forms and ideas, he wrote:

I say that one must be a seer, make oneself a seer. The poet makes himself a seer by a long, prodigious, and rational disordering of all the senses. Every form of love, of suffering, of madness; he searches himself, he consumes all the poisons in him, and keeps only their quintessences. This is an unspeakable torture during which he needs all his faith and superhuman strength, and during which he becomes the great patient, the great criminal, the great accursed—and the great learned one!—among men.—For he arrives at the unknown! Because he has cultivated his own soul—which was rich to begin with—more than any other man! He reaches the unknown; and even if, crazed, he ends up by losing the understanding of his visions, at least he has seen them! Let him die charging through those unutterable, unnameable things: other horrible workers will come; they will begin from the horizons where he has succumbed!

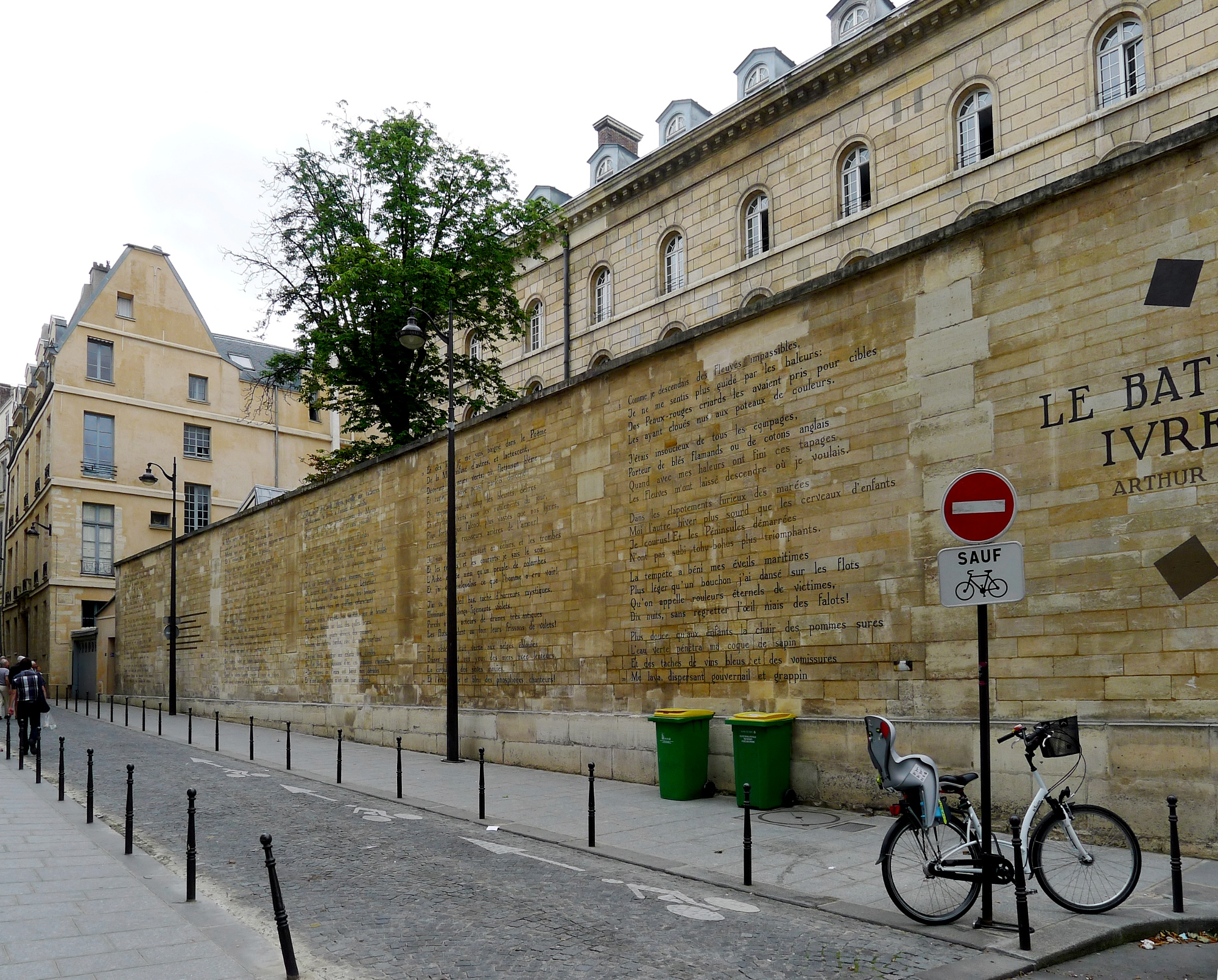
The poem Le Bateau ivre on a wall in the Rue Férou, Paris, 6th arrondissement

Rimbaud expounded the same ideas in his poem "Le Bateau ivre" ("The Drunken Boat"). This hundred-line poem tells the tale of a boat that breaks free of human society when its handlers are killed by "Redskins" (Peaux-Rouges). At first, thinking that it is drifting where it pleases, the boat soon realizes that it is being guided by and to the "poem of the sea". It sees visions both magnificent ("the awakening blue and yellow of singing phosphores", "l'éveil jaune et bleu des phosphores chanteurs") and disgusting ("nets where in the reeds an entire Leviathan was rotting" "nasses / Où pourrit dans les joncs tout un Léviathan"). It ends floating and washed clean, wishing only to sink and become one with the sea.

Archibald MacLeish has commented on this poem: "Anyone who doubts that poetry can say what prose cannot has only to read the so-called Lettres du Voyant and Bateau ivre together. What is pretentious and adolescent in the Lettres is true in the poem—unanswerably true."

While "Le Bateau ivre" was still written in a mostly conventional style, despite its inventions, his later poems from 1872 (commonly called Derniers vers or Vers nouveaux et chansons, although he did not give them a title) further deconstructed the French verse, introducing odd rhythms and loose rhyming schemes, with even more abstract and flimsy themes.

After Une saison en enfer, his "prodigious psychological biography written in this diamond prose which is his exclusive property" (according to Paul Verlaine), a poetic prose in which he himself commented some of his verse poems from 1872, and the perceived failure of his own past endeavours ("Alchimie du verbe"), he went on to write the prose poems known as Illuminations, (Note: Although it remains uncertain if he wrote at least parts of Illuminations before Une saison en enfer. Albert Camus in L'homme révolté claims that this is irrelevant, for those two major works were "suffered in the same time", regardless of when they were each actually executed.) forfeiting preconceived structures altogether to explore hitherto unused resources of poetic language, bestowing most of the pieces with a disjointed, hallucinatory, dreamlike quality. Rimbaud died without the benefit of knowing that his manuscripts not only had been published but were lauded and studied, having finally gained the recognition for which he had striven.

Then he stopped writing poetry altogether. His friend Ernest Delahaye, in a letter to Paul Verlaine around 1875, claimed that he had completely forgotten about his past self writing poetry. (Note: « Des vers de lui ? Il y a beau temps que sa verve est à plat. Je crois même qu'il ne se souvient plus du tout d'en avoir fait. ») French poet and scholar Gérard Macé wrote: "Rimbaud is, first and foremost, this silence that can't be forgotten, and which, for anyone attempting to write themselves, is there, haunting. He even forbids us to fall into silence; because he did, this, better than anyone."

French poet Paul Valéry stated that "all known literature is written in the language of common sense—except Rimbaud's". His poetry influenced the Symbolists, Dadaists, and Surrealists, and later writers adopted not only some of his themes but also his inventive use of form and language.

== Letters ==
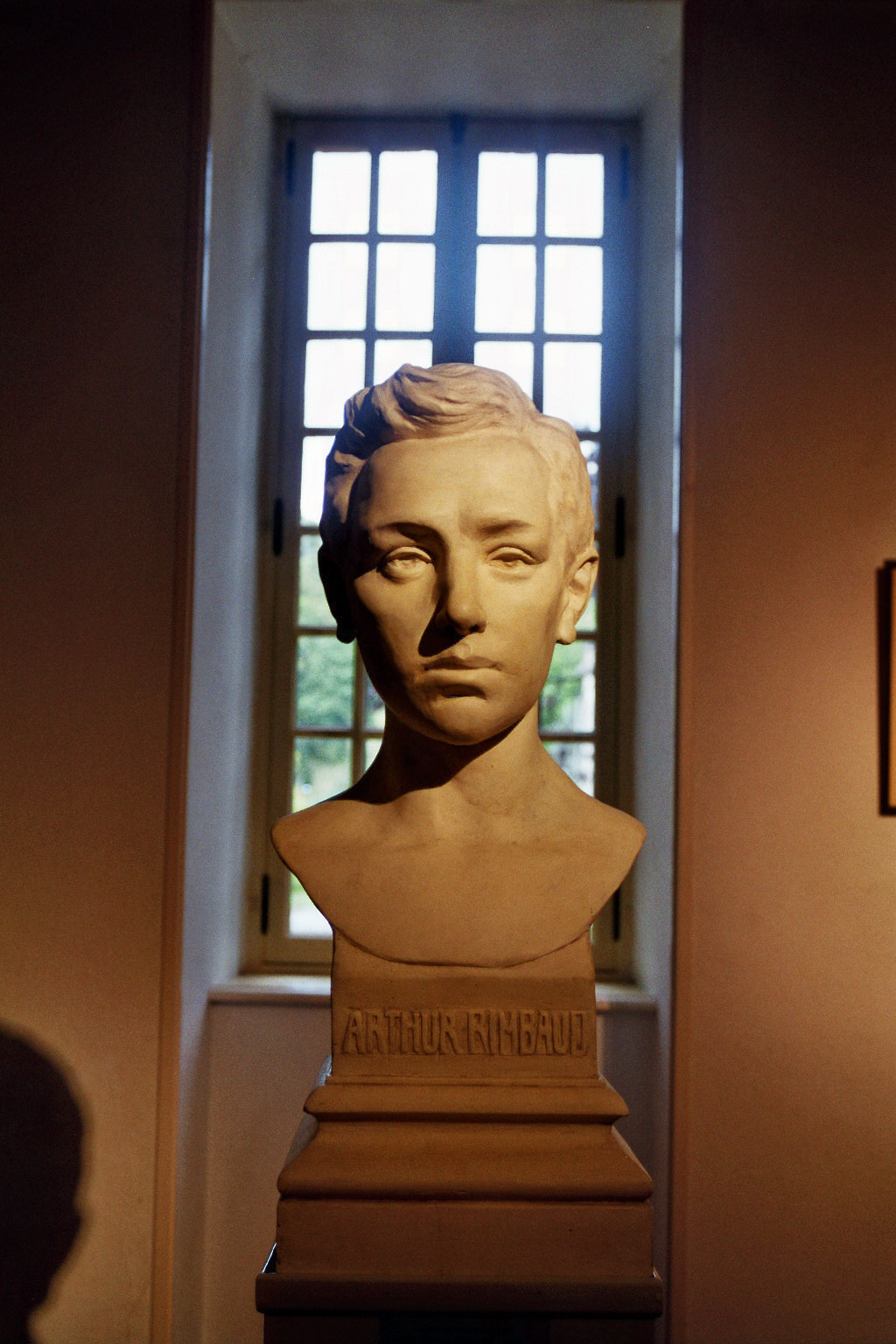
Bust of Rimbaud. Musée Arthur Rimbaud, Charleville-Mézières

Rimbaud was a prolific correspondent and his letters provide vivid accounts of his life and relationships. "Rimbaud's letters concerning his literary life were first published by various periodicals. In 1931 they were collected and published by Jean-Marie Carré. Many errors were corrected in the [1946] Pléiade edition. The letters written in Africa were first published by Paterne Berrichon, the poet's brother-in-law, who took the liberty of making many changes in the texts."

== Works ==
=== Works published before 1891 ===
- "Les Étrennes des orphelins" (1869) – poem published in La revue pour tous, 2 January 1870
- "Première soirée" (1870) – poem published in La charge, 13 August 1870 (with the more catchy title "Trois baisers", also known as "Comédie en trois baisers")
- "Le rêve de Bismarck" (1870) – prose published in Le Progrès des Ardennes, 25 November 1870 (re-discovered in 2008)
- "Le Dormeur du val" (The Sleeper in the Valley) (1870) – poem published in Anthologie des poètes français, 1888
- "Voyelles" (1871 or 1872) – poem published in Lutèce, 5 October 1883
- "Le Bateau ivre", "Voyelles", "Oraison du soir", "Les assis", "Les effarés", "Les chercheuses de poux" (1870–1872) – poems published by Paul Verlaine in his anthology Les Poètes maudits, 1884
- "Les corbeaux" (1871 or 1872) – poem published in La renaissance littéraire et artistique, 14 September 1872
- "Qu'est-ce pour nous mon cœur..." (1872) – poem published in La Vogue, 7 June 1886
- Une Saison en Enfer (1873) – collection of prose poetry published by Rimbaud himself as a small booklet in Brussels in October 1873 ("A few copies were distributed to friends in Paris... Rimbaud almost immediately lost interest in the work.")
- Illuminations (1872–1875 ?) – collection of prose poetry published in 1886 (this original edition included 35 out of the 42 known pieces)
- Rapport sur l'Ogadine (1883) – published by the Société de Géographie in February 1884

=== Posthumous works ===
- Narration ("Le Soleil était encore chaud...") (c. 1864–1865) – prose published by Paterne Berrichon in 1897
- Lettre de Charles d'Orléans à Louis XI (1869 or 1870) – prose published in Revue de l'évolution sociale, scientifique et littéraire, November 1891
- Un coeur sous une soutane (1870) – prose published in Littérature, June 1924
- Reliquaire – Poésies – published by Rodolphe Darzens in 1891 (Note: This book contained most known poems from Rimbaud's earlier period, composed in 1870–1871, plus a few from 1872, now grouped in the ensemble known as Derniers vers or Vers nouveaux et chansons ("Âge d'or", "Éternité", "Michel et Christine", "Entends comme brame..."), and also four poems which were later considered by most specialists to be misattributed to Rimbaud and removed from later editions ("Poison perdu", "Le Limaçon", "Doctrine", "Les Cornues").)
- Poésies complètes (c. 1869–1873) – published in 1895 with a preface from Paul Verlaine (Note: This book contained most known poems from Rimbaud's earlier period, composed in 1870–1871, some of his later poems from 1872 now grouped as the so-called Derniers vers ("Mémoire", "Fêtes de la faim", "Jeune ménage", "Est-elle almée ?...", "Patience" which corresponds to "Bannières de mai" in later editions, "Entends comme brame..." – but excluding "Âge d'or", "Éternité" and "Michel et Christine" which were in the 1891 collection), and five poems from Illuminations which were not in the original 1886 edition of that work and were found again since then ("Fairy", "Guerre", "Génie", "Jeunesse", "Solde"); therefore, despite its name, it was still far from complete, and it included "Poison perdu" which was later considered by most specialists to be falsely attributed to Rimbaud. Among the known 1870–1871 poems included in current editions, were still missing: "Ce qu'on dit au poète à propos de fleurs", "Les douaniers", "Les mains de Marie-Jeanne", "Les sœurs de charité", "L'étoile a pleuré rose...", "L'homme juste". Only two poems from that period were absent from the 1891 collection and included to the 1895 collection: "Les étrennes des orphelins" and "Les corbeaux".)
- "Les mains de Marie-Jeanne" (1871 ?) – poem published in Littérature, June 1919 (it was mentioned by Paul Verlaine in his 1884 anthology Les poètes maudits, along with other lost poems he knew about, some of which were never found)
- Lettres du Voyant (13 & 15 May 1871) – letter to Georges Izambard (13 May) published by Izambard in La revue européenne, October 1928 – letter to Paul Demeny (15 May) published by Paterne Berrichon in La nouvelle revue française, October 1912
- Album Zutique (1871) – parodies – among those poems, the "Sonnet du trou du cul" ("The arsehole sonnet") and two other sonnets (the three of them being called "Les Stupra") were published in Littérature, May 1922 – others from this ensemble appeared later in editions of Rimbaud's complete works
- Les Déserts de l'amour (Deserts of Love) (c. 1871–1872) – prose published in La revue littéraire de Paris et Champagne, September 1906
- Proses "évangeliques" (1872–1873) – three prose texts, one published in La revue blanche, September 1897, the two others in Le Mercure de France, January 1948 (no title was given by Arthur Rimbaud)
- Lettres de Jean-Arthur Rimbaud – Égypte, Arabie, Éthiopie (1880–1891) – published by Paterne Berrichon in 1899 (with many contentious edits)

== Cultural legacy ==
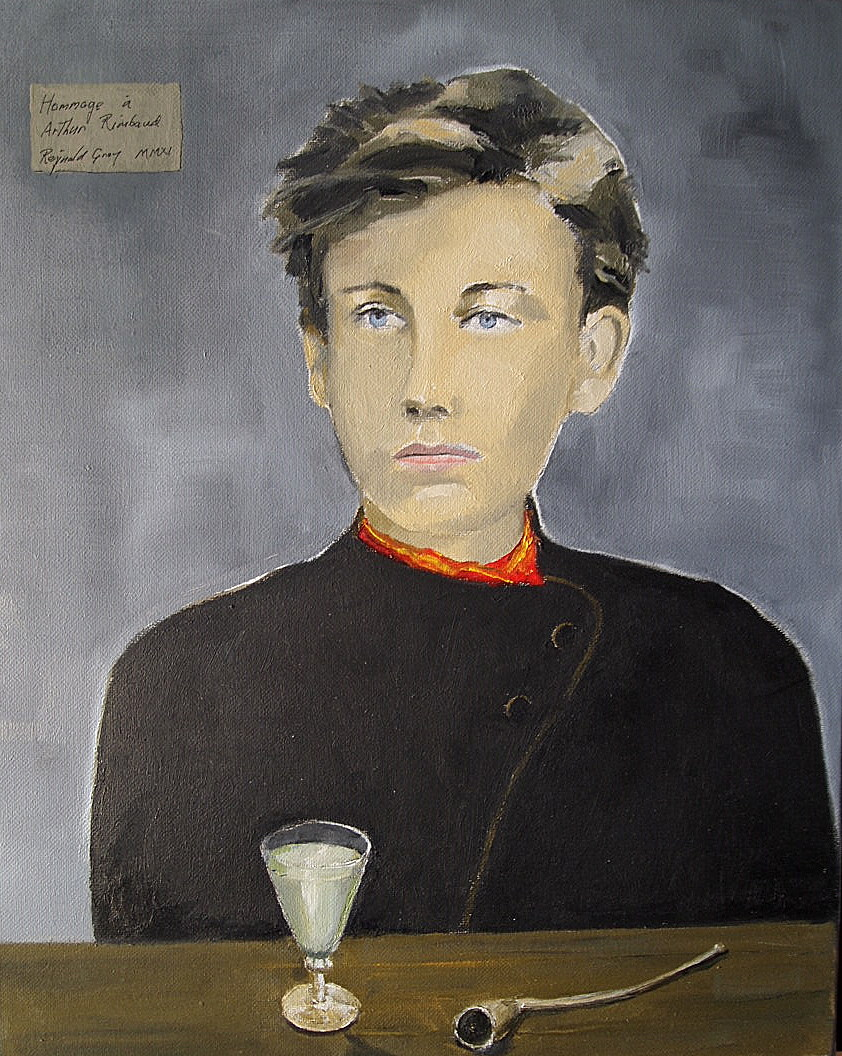
Reginald Gray's portrait (2011)

University of Exeter professor Martin Sorrell argues that Rimbaud was and remains influential in not only literary and artistic circles but in political spheres, having inspired anti-rationalist revolutions in America, Italy, Russia, and Germany. Sorrell praises Rimbaud as a poet whose "reputation stands very high today", pointing out his influence on musicians Jim Morrison, Bob Dylan, Luis Alberto Spinetta, Patti Smith, and writer Octavio Paz. Dylan has referred to Rimbaud multiple times over his career, including in the track "You're Gonna Make Me Lonesome When You Go" (1975, on Blood on the Tracks).

=== Media portrayals ===
Rimbaud has been depicted in various media, including:

- 1964: Alan Bickford in A Season in Hell
- 1971: Nelo Risi's film Una stagione all'inferno (A season in hell), with Terence Stamp as Rimbaud and Jean-Claude Brialy as Verlaine.
- 1978: Lorenzo Ferrero's opera Rimbaud, ou Le Fils du soleil (Rimbaud, or the Child of the Sun)
- 1979: David Wojnarowicz's photographic series "Arthur Rimbaud in New York", which contrasts Rimbaud's face with life in New York City in the late 1970s.
- 1991: Pierre Michon's "critical fiction" Rimbaud le fils (Rimbaud the Son), which dramatizes Rimbaud's family life.
- 1995: Agnieszka Holland's film Total Eclipse, based on a 1967 play by Christopher Hampton. It starred Leonardo DiCaprio as Rimbaud and David Thewlis as Verlaine.
- 2007: Todd Haynes' film I'm Not There, a musical drama which starred Ben Whishaw as Rimbaud, depicting him as one of the six facets of Bob Dylan's public personas.
- 2025: Jessica Benhamou's film Alchemy of the Word, starring James Craven as Rimbaud and Jordan Luke Gage as Verlaine.
- 2026: Patrick Wang's film A. Rimbaud (2026), an abstract biographical film about Rimbaud, stars Blake Draper as Rimbaud.

=== Musical adaptations ===
Rimbaud's works have been set to music by individuals and groups including:

- Benjamin Britten: Les Illuminations (1939), a song cycle
- Hans Krása, Three Songs to texts of Arthur Rimbaud, 1943 (Sensation, Les Amis, L’étoile a pleuré rose), recorded by Christian Gerhaher
- Regina Hansen Willman: "Apres le Deluge" (1961)
- Hans Werner Henze: "Being Beauteous" (1963), a cantata
- Bill Hopkins: Sensation (1965), a setting of poetry by Rimbaud and Samuel Beckett.
- Denise Roger: 3 Poèmes d'Arthur Rimbaud (1966)
- Marc Almond: "My Little Lovers (Mes petites amoureuses)" (1993, on Absinthe)
- Dum Dum Girls: “Rimbaud Eyes” (2014, on Too True released by Sub Pop)

=== Landmarks ===
Rimbaud's inscription of his name can be seen at the Temple of Luxor in Egypt. It can be found "carved... into the ancient stone of the south end's transverse hall".

== See also ==
- Rimbaud and Verlaine Foundation
- Zutiste

== Citations ==
=== Sources ===
- Adam, Antoine, ed. (1999) [1972], Rimbaud: Œuvres complètes (in French), Paris: Pléiade (Éditions Gallimard), ISBN 978-2070104765
- Bernard, Suzanne; Guyaux, André (1991), Œuvres de Rimbaud (in French), Paris: Classiques Garnier, ISBN 2-04-017399-4
- Bousmanne, Bernard (2006), Reviens, reviens, cher ami. Rimbaud – Verlaine. L'Affaire de Bruxelles (in French), Paris: Éditions Calmann-Lévy, ISBN 978-2702137215
- Brunel, Pierre, ed. (2004), Rimbaud: Œuvres complètes (in French), Paris: Le Livre de Poche, ISBN 978-2253131212
- Delahaye, Ernest (1974) [1919], Delahaye, témoin de Rimbaud (in French), Geneva: La Baconnière, ISBN 978-2825200711
- Fowlie, Wallace; Whidden, Seth (2005), Rimbaud, Complete Works, Selected Letters (Revised and updated ed.), Chicago: University of Chicago Press, ISBN 0-226-71977-4
- Dubois, Colette (1 February 2003), L'or blanc de Djibouti. Salines et sauniers (XIXe-XXe siècles) (in French), KARTHALA Editions, ISBN 978-2-8111-3613-0
- Goodman, Richard (September 2001), "Arthur Rimbaud, Coffee Trader", Saudi Aramco World, 52 (5), archived from the original on 7 May 2012
- Guyaux, André, ed. (2009), Rimbaud Œuvres complètes (in French) (New revised ed.), Paris: Gallimard / Bibliothèque de la Pléiade, ISBN 978-2070116010
- Hackett, Cecil Arthur (2010) [1981], Rimbaud: A critical introduction (Digital ed.), Cambridge: Cambridge University Press, ISBN 978-0521297561
- Harding, Jeremy; Sturrock, John (2004), Arthur Rimbaud: Selected Poems and Letters, Penguin, ISBN 0-14-044802-0
- Ivry, Benjamin (1998), Arthur Rimbaud, Bath, Somerset: Absolute Press, ISBN 1-899791-55-8
- Jeancolas, Claude (1998), Passion Rimbaud: L'Album d'une vie (in French), Paris: Textuel, ISBN 978-2-909317-66-3
- Kwasny, Melissa (2004), Toward the Open Field: Poets on the Art of Poetry, Middletown, Conn: Wesleyan University Press, ISBN 0-8195-6606-3
- Lefrère, Jean-Jacques (2001), Arthur Rimbaud (in French), Paris: Fayard, ISBN 978-2-213-60691-0
- Lefrère, Jean-Jacques (2007), Correspondance de Rimbaud (in French), Paris: Fayard, ISBN 978-2-213-63391-6
- Lefrère, Jean-Jacques (2014), Arthur Rimbaud: Correspondance posthume (1912-1920) (in French), Paris: Fayard, ISBN 978-2213662749
- Leuwers, Daniel (1998), Rimbaud: Les Lettres du voyant, Textes Fondateurs (in French), Paris: Éditions Ellipses, ISBN 978-2729867980
- MacLeish, Archibald (1965), Poetry and Experience, Baltimore: Penguin, ISBN 978-0140550443
- Mason, Wyatt (2003), Poetry and prose, Rimbaud Complete, vol. 1, New York: Modern Library, ISBN 978-0-375-7577-09
- Mason, Wyatt (2004), I Promise to Be Good: The Letters of Arthur Rimbaud, Rimbaud Complete, vol. 2, New York: Modern Library, ISBN 978-0-679-64301-2
- Miller, Henry, The Time of the Assassins, A Study of Rimbaud, New York 1962.
- Nicholl, Charles (1999), Somebody Else: Arthur Rimbaud in Africa 1880–91, Chicago: University of Chicago Press, ISBN 0-226-58029-6
- Peyre, Henri (1974), A Season in Hell and The Illuminations, New York: Oxford University Press, ISBN 0-19-501760-9
- Porter, Laurence M. (1990), The Crisis of French Symbolism (hardcover) (First ed.), Ithaca, NY: Cornell University Press, ISBN 978-0-8014-2418-2
- Rickword, Edgell (1971) [1924], Rimbaud: The Boy and the Poet, New York: Haskell House Publishers, ISBN 0-8383-1309-4
- Robb, Graham (2000), Rimbaud, New York: W.W. Norton & Co, ISBN 978-0330482820
- Schmidt, Paul (2000) [1976], Rimbaud: Complete Works, New York: Perennial (HarperCollins), ISBN 978-0-06-095550-2
- Spitzer, Mark (2002), From Absinthe to Abyssinia, Berkeley: Creative Arts, ISBN 978-0887392931
- Starkie, Enid (1973) [1938], Arthur Rimbaud, London: Faber and Faber, ISBN 0-571-10440-1
- Steinmetz, Jean-Luc (2001), Arthur Rimbaud: Presence of an Enigma, Jon Graham (trans), New York: Welcome Rain Publishers, ISBN 1-56649-106-1
- Underwood, Vernon (2005) [1976], Rimbaud et l'Angleterre (in French), Paris: A G Nizet, ISBN 978-2707804082
- Whidden, Seth (2018), Arthur Rimbaud, London: Reaktion, ISBN 978-1780239804
- White, Edmund (2008), Rimbaud: The Double Life of a Rebel, London: Grove, ISBN 978-1-84354-971-0
