= Ernest Delahaye =

French writer and essayist

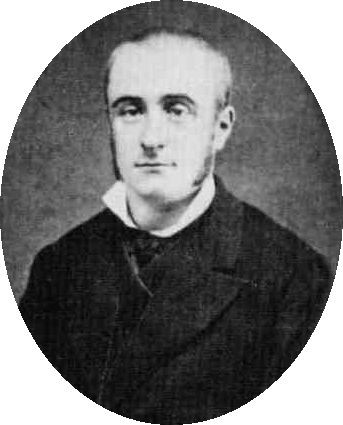
Delahaye, anonymous photograph, about 1890.

Ernest Delahaye (1 September 1853 – 20 November 1930) was a French writer and essayist. He maintained a long and close friendship with Arthur Rimbaud whom he first met in April 1865 when they attended school together in Charleville in the Ardennes region of France.

He and Rimbaud had a shared interest in poetry, and he would help Rimbaud by making fair copies of his drafts for distribution to Rimbaud's literary friends. He was one of the few (seven) recipients of the privately printed A Season in Hell, though Rimbaud later asked for it back to give it to someone else. According to Rimbaud biographer, Charles Nicholl, Rimbaud's "[last] strictly dateable poem" was contained in a letter to Delahaye of 14 October 1875. Through Rimbaud, Delahaye also met poet Paul Verlaine and became friendly with him. Verlaine wrote a poem - Sonnet Boiteux - which is dedicated to him. Delahaye mixed his civil service career, working at the Education Ministry, with writing biographical material on both Rimbaud and Verlaine, contributing first-hand accounts of the poets' lives and families.

== Works ==
- Delahaye, Ernest (1974) [1919], Delahaye, témoin de Rimbaud (in French), Geneva: La Baconnière, ISBN 978-2825200711
- Delahaye, Ernest (2007), Rimbaud; l'artiste et l'être moral (in French), Paris: Cerf, ISBN 978-2204083447
- Delahaye, Ernest; Vecchiet, Jean-Michel (2010), Mon ami Rimbaud (in French), Paris: Editions Naïve, ISBN 978-2350212159

== Sources ==
- Lefrère, Jean-Jacques (2001), Arthur Rimbaud (in French), Paris: Fayard
- Lefrère, Jean-Jacques (2007), Correspondance de Rimbaud (in French), Paris: Fayard
- Nicholl, Charles (1999), Somebody Else: Arthur Rimbaud in Africa 1880–91, Chicago: University of Chicago Press
- Robb, Graham (2000), Rimbaud, New York: W.W. Norton & Co
- Starkie, Enid (1973), Arthur Rimbaud, London: Faber and Faber
- White, Edmund (2008), Rimbaud: The Double Life of a Rebel, London: Grove
