= Poésies (Rimbaud) =

Poetry collection by Arthur Rimbaud

Poésies is the title attributed to the poems of Arthur Rimbaud written between approx. 1869 and 1873. Les étrennes des orphelins (1869) is the first known poem of Rimbaud.

The only poems published during the poet's time of writing were Les Étrennes des orphelins in La revue pour tous (January 2, 1870), Trois baisers in La Charge (August 13, 1870), and Les Corbeaux in La renaissance littéraire et artistique (September 14, 1872). Rimbaud also sent three poems (Credo in Unam/Soleil et Chair, Ophélie and Sensation) to the poet Théodore de Banville in a letter dated May 24, 1870.

The first collection of his poems was published under the title Le Reliquaire by Rodolphe Darzens (1891) while Rimbaud was dying in Marseille.

"Le bateau ivre" is probably his best-known poem.
