= Claude Jeancolas =

French writer, art historian and journalist (1949–2016)

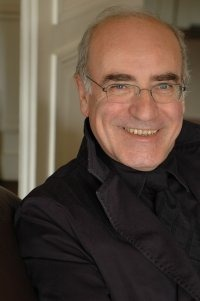
- Born: 10 June 1949; Nancy, France
- Died: 10 February 2016 (aged 66); Paris, France
- Occupations: Journalist, writer, art historian

Claude Jeancolas (10 June 1949 – 10 February 2016) was a French writer, art historian, and journalist. He is best known for his work on Arthur Rimbaud.

== Life ==
Jeancolas spent his childhood and adolescence in Nancy, in eastern France. At the age of 16, after having attained a Baccalaureate Diploma, he moved to Paris. In Paris, he continued his studies in a preparatory class for the "grandes écoles," and afterwards entered the École Supérieure de Commerce of Paris (ESCP). He earned a degree from the Business School of the University of Texas, where he wrote his thesis on the management of the American press. Claude was a visiting scholar at various American universities, including UCLA, Stanford University, the University of California at Berkeley, San Francisco State University, the School of Journalism in Columbia, Missouri, and Columbia University in New York. He died on 10 February 2016.

== Career ==
=== Journalism career ===
Jeancolas began his career as the head of the financial analysis department of the weekly magazine Entreprise. He then founded two management journals: Enseignement et gestion and Revue Française de Gestion. Subsequently, he became the head of the avant-garde monthly Mode International. He later edited the magazines Collections, Décoration, and Mariages. He moved to Votre Beauté, a magazine that François Mitterrand edited early in his career. Jeancolas then joined the Hachette Group (now the Lagardère Group) as the international editor of Elle (which saw four editions created worldwide) and Elle Décoration (which saw 14 editions created worldwide). He also created Cousteau Junior and Max. Until 2012, he was the director of Marie Claire Maison and Marie Claire travel magazines in Milan.

=== Art historian career ===
His interest in art developed in 1969 after meeting the sculptor Edmond Moirignot, with whom he became a close friend and later the guardian and executor of his will. In 1987, he published a monograph on the sculptor Jean-Baptiste Carpeaux. Following this publication, Jeancolas studied the history of sculpture and French drawing. He later published two books on the Nabis and the Fauves.

== Rimbaud ==
Jeancolas studied Rimbaud's work and regularly published on the topic. He believed Rimbaud to be too intelligent to be incoherent, as he was at the top of his class. He also wrote about Une Saison en enfer. Additionally, he wrote about the poet's highly criticized mother, Vitalie Rimbaud, in a biography that aimed to demonstrate the love she had for her child and her importance to Rimbaud.

== Bibliography ==
Main publications:

1985

- Moirignot. Éditions du St Gothard. Paris

1987

- Carpeaux peintre et sculpteur. Edita. Lausanne

1991

- La Sculpture italienne du XX^{e} siècle. Éditions Van Wilder. Paris
- Les Voyages de Rimbaud. Balland. Paris
- Le Dictionnaire Rimbaud. Balland. Paris

1993

- La Sculpture française. Fabbri. Milan

1995

- Le Dessin en France de la renaissance au XX^{e} siècle. Rizzoli. Milan

1996

- L'œuvre intégrale manuscrite de Rimbaud. Textuel. Paris

1997

- Le Don du père. Flammarion. Paris
- Les Lettres manuscrites de Rimbaud. Textuel. Paris

1998

- Lettres et poèmes de Rimbaud. L'auberge verte. Paris
- Une saison en enfer de Rimbaud. Hachette. Paris
- Passion Rimbaud. Textuel. Paris

1999

- Poésies de Rimbaud. Éditions mille et une nuits. Paris
- Rimbaud, la biographie. Flammarion. Paris
- Venise et ses peintres. Une histoire intime. Éditions Van Wilder. Paris
- L'Afrique de Rimbaud. Textuel. Paris

2000

- Rimbaud, l'œuvre. Textuel. Paris

2002

- La Peinture des Nabis. Éditions fvw. Paris

2004

- Vitalie Rimbaud, pour l'amour d'un fils. biographie. Flammarion
- Rimbaud après Rimbaud, anthologie. Textuel. Paris

2005

- Rimbaud, l'œuvre, la vie. Éditions France Loisirs

2006

- Les Fauves, couleurs et lumières. Éditions FVW. Paris
- Moirignot, la vie, l'œuvre, le catalogue raisonné. Éditions FVW. Paris

2007

- Le regard bleu d'Arthur Rimbaud. Éditions FVW. Paris

2008 in collaboration

- Fierté de fer with Joël Alessandra et Idriss Youssouf Elmi. Éditions Paquet. Genève
- L'aube du monde with Thibaut et Pascal Villecroix, Amina Saïd Chiré - FVW. Paris

2008

- Le Retour à Tadjoura – l'Afrique secrète de Jean-François Deniau – FVW. Paris

Many of these have been translated into German, Korean, Japanese and English.
