= Paterne Berrichon =

French artist, born Pierre Dufour

Paterne Berrichon, the pseudonym of Pierre-Eugène Dufour (10 January 1855, Issoudun – 30 July 1922, La Rochefoucauld) was a French poet, painter, sculptor and designer. He is best known as husband of Isabelle Rimbaud, and the brother-in-law and publisher of Arthur Rimbaud.

== Biography ==
After attending the lycée in Châteauroux, Dufour moved to Paris where he studied sculpture and painting, and was soon moving in artistic and literary circles. He met the art critic from Châteauroux, George-Albert Aurier, made the acquaintance of Paul Verlaine and adopted the pseudonym "Paterne Berrichon". In 1896, he published the poems of his youth in which he showed the original and slightly excessive side to his personality. Fervent admirer of Arthur Rimbaud, he started a correspondence with Isabelle Rimbaud, the younger sister of the poet, which concluded in 1897 by marriage. Once together, they strove to perpetuate the cult of the poet from Charleville. In perfect tune with the social attitudes of the time, the Berrichons' not always objective approach to the life and works of Rimbaud was characterised by an inflexible ideology based on traditional values of respectability and morality. Their overriding desire was to present an angelic Rimbaud erasing the infernal periods of the poet's life; was seeking to establish that Rimbaud's relationship with Verlaine was chaste; and that Rimbaud rediscovered his catholic faith on his death bed. In his edition of Rimbaud's works, for which he had obtained the backing of Paul Claudel, Paterne Berrichon made at least a third of the poems and about two thirds of the correspondence disappear. Berrichon was the friend of Paul Claudel and maintained a prolific correspondence with him from 1912 until 1919. He also created paintings, for which his wife often modelled, and sculpted a bust for the Rimbaud monument in the poet's birthplace, Charleville-Mézières. A publishing house, established in Crest, Drôme and specialising in poetry, called itself the "Enemies of Paterne Berrichon" to denounce the distorted and commercialised practices of Rimbaud's brother-in-law.

== Drawings ==
Works by Paterne Berrichon

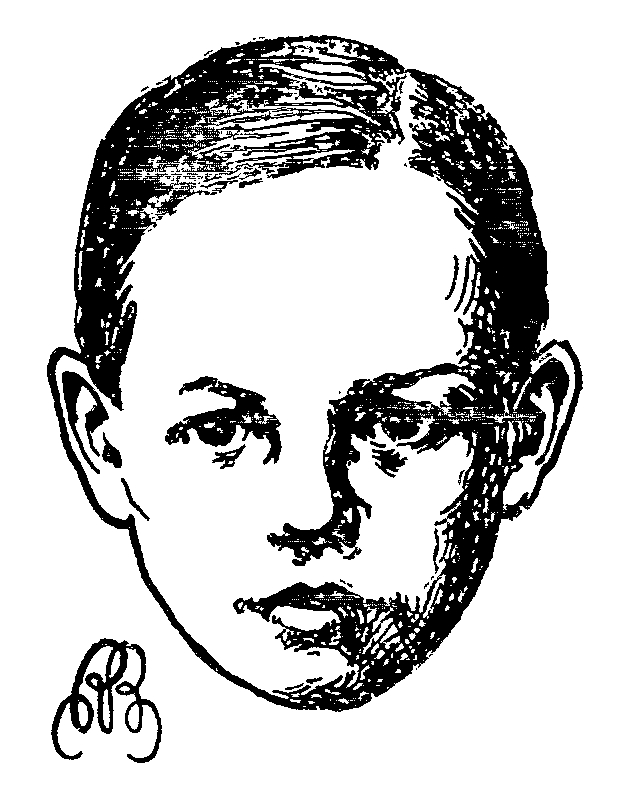
Rimbaud at 12 years, appeared in La Revue blanche in 1897.

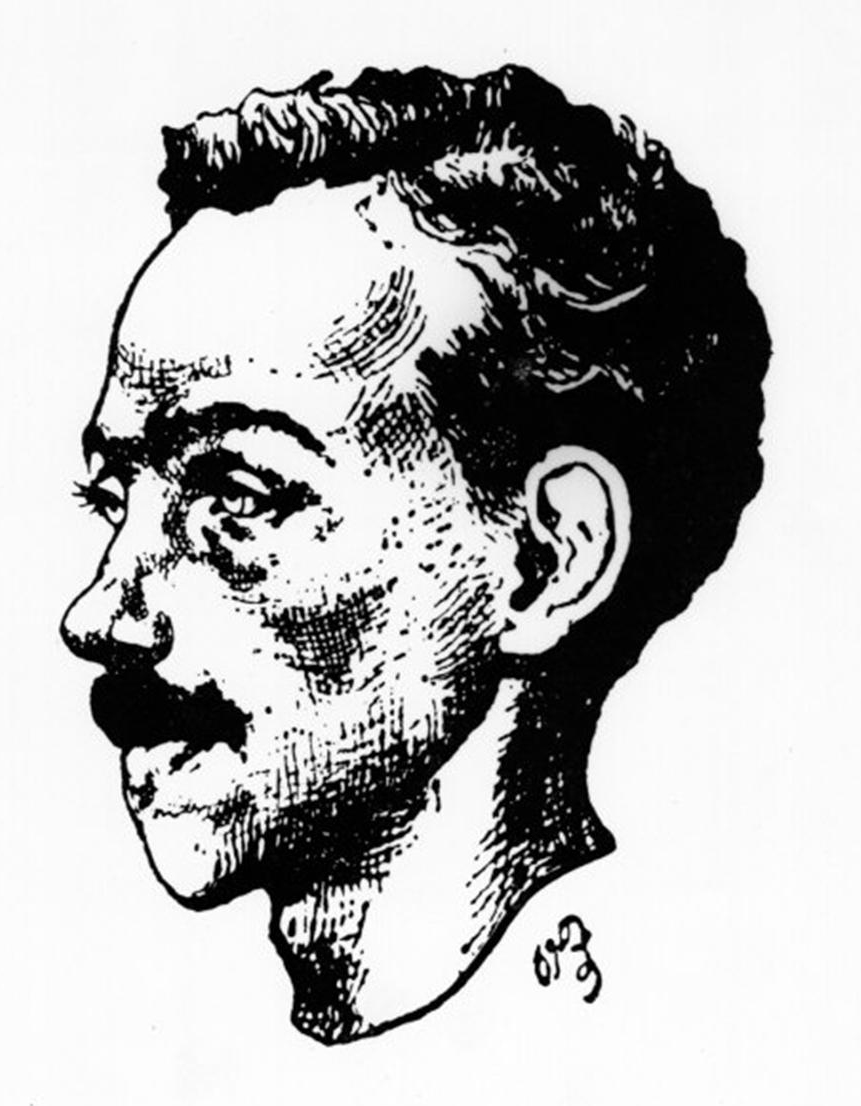
Mask of Rimbaud, after a drawing by Isabelle Rimbaud.

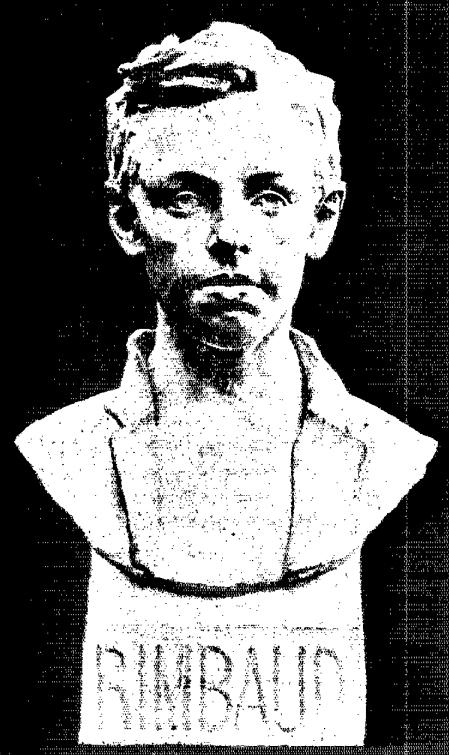
Bust of Rimbaud, appeared in La Plume in 1900.

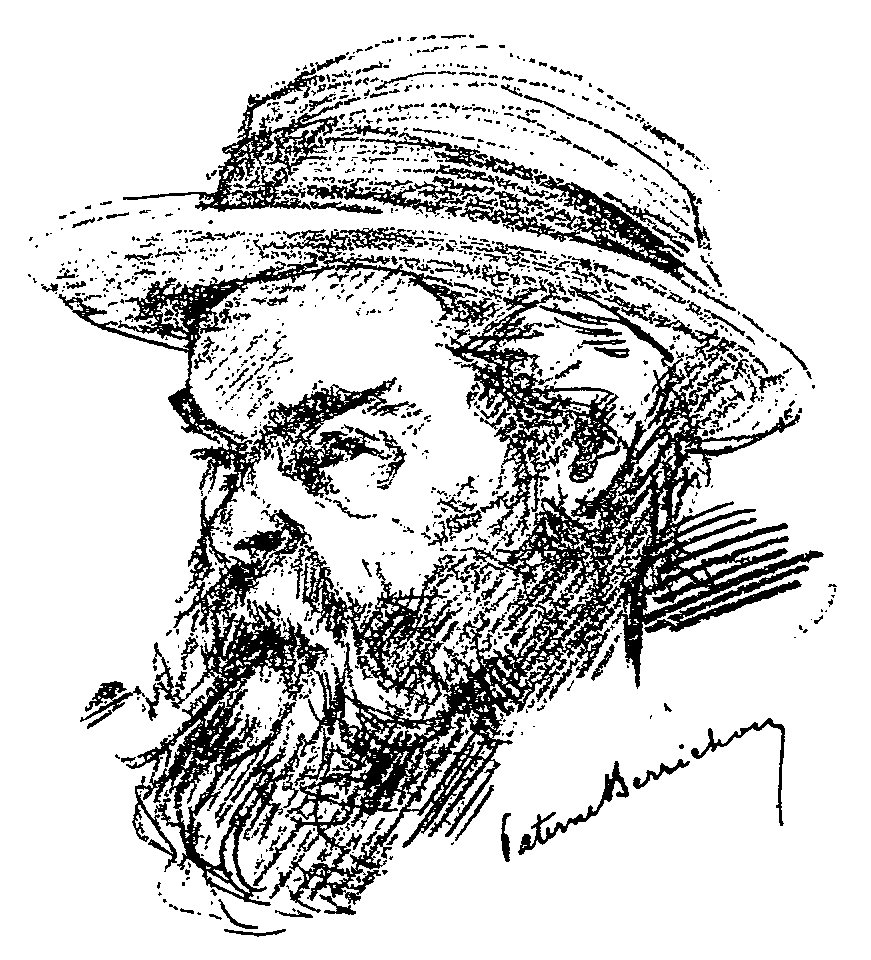
Paul Verlaine, appeared in La Plume in 1896.

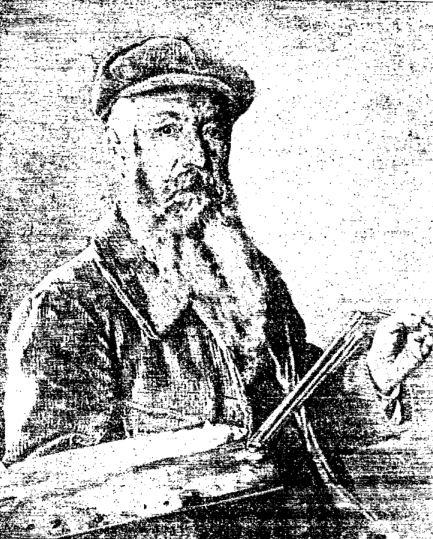
Berrichon: self-portrait, appeared in La Plume in 1904.

== Publications ==
Poetry

- Le Vin Maudit, petits poèmes, with a frontispiece by Paul Verlaine (1896)
- Poèmes décadents 1883-1895 (1910)

On Rimbaud

- La Vie de Jean-Arthur Rimbaud, Mercure de France, Paris, 1897 Texte en ligne
- Jean-Arthur Rimbaud le poète (1854-1873), Mercure de France, Paris, 1912. Republished: Klincksieck, Paris, 2004
- Arthur Rimbaud. Œuvres, verse and prose, rediscovered poems. Mercure de France, Paris, 1912
- Arthur Rimbaud. Poésies review by Paterne Berrichon; after Fantin-Latour, Messein, Paris, 1919
- Arthur Rimbaud. Œuvres, verse and prose, rediscovered poems, reviews, organised and annotated by Paterne Berrichon, preface by Paul Claudel, Mercure de France, Paris, 1924

Correspondence

- Arthur Rimbaud. Ébauches, suivies de la correspondance entre Isabelle Rimbaud et Paterne Berrichon et de Rimbaud en Orient, variations and associated documents gathered by Marguerite Yerta-Méléra, Mercure de France, Paris, 1937
