= Soleil et chair =

Recording in French by Vincent Planchon for Audiocité

"Soleil et chair" ("Sun and Flesh" in English) is a poem written by Arthur Rimbaud in May 1870. The work, while being unmistakably Rimbaud, nevertheless exhibits the influence that both Romanticism and Latin writers such as Horace, Virgil, and Lucretius had on his early style. It takes the tone of a hymn to the sun and earth—with overt sexual overtones—which periodically lapses into a lament of the abyss that now separates Man from Nature. Throughout, double entendres figure widely, often providing the sexual innuendos. The poem, which consists of four sections, is written in Alexandrins, or 12-syllable lines—typical to French verse in the same way that iambic pentameter is to English. In spite of its relatively classical form, the direct nature of its venereal themes sounds shockingly modern to even today's reader; moreover, the sheer creativity of Rimbaud's imagery would seem to presage his later refinement of this stylistic trait, which has since earned him the title of Visionary.

== Background ==
Along with several other poems, including his much anthologized "Ophélie," Rimbaud sent it (then titled "Credo in Unam,") to Théodore de Banville early in his career, although it went largely unnoticed by the older poet. Fifteen years old when he wrote the poem, Rimbaud reveals his impeccable ability to imitate sexual innuendo as he had learned it from Latin writers, in particular Latin erotic poetry. Under the instruction of a private tutor, Rimbaud had become an accomplished student of Latin, and he even composed some of his early verses in the language.

One also hears an elevated tone in the poem reminiscent of such French Romantic poets as Victor Hugo, and in its idealization of nature it adheres closely to the attitude of much Romantic literature.

== Style ==
To outline the stylistic heritage of this poem, however, should not suggest that Rimbaud failed to go beyond the experiments of his predecessors. The fixation on sexuality in this poem is characteristic of much of Rimbaud's oeuvre, and it is moreover the sheer bluntness with which he communicates it that is so shocking, controversial, and typical of him. In what would otherwise seem like an innocent paean for nature, Rimbaud begins the first two lines with a graphic image of the sun essentially ejaculating its light onto the nubile earth. The poem's speaker revels in his position between the lustful relationship of the sun and earth.

"Soleil et chair," like some of Rimbaud's other early works, are important because they illustrate the predominant style from which he, along with his fellow symbolist poets, had learned and were to soon abandon in many ways. In it we notice what is simply the pleasant mastery of language, and thus the verses not only invite interpretation of their bold philosophy, but also allow the reader to delight in its imaginative and oral qualities.

== Themes ==
The poem's first title, "Credo in Unam," alludes to the Apostles' Creed, which begins, "I believe in God, the Father almighty, creator of heaven and earth." Over the course of the poem, Rimbaud continually contrasts the suffocating nature of monotheism with the sheer diversity of polytheism such as it existed in Greek and Roman times. Rhythmically, the poem is incredibly strong. The phrase, "Je regrette le temps de" (I miss the time of...") is almost the chorus to which Rimbaud periodically returns as he portrays the diversity of life that has disappeared with the rise of Christianity. Rimbaud focuses on such pagan deities as Cybele (the Earth), Venus (Beauty), Eros (Love), and the Sun. By assigning overtly sexual overtones to them, he also suggests the fertility that they embody. In the eyes of the young Rimbaud, the various deities exists in a complementary relationship to each other (the male Sun and female Earth).

In addition, Pan with his company of fauns and satyrs, are ever present; they serve to cast the polytheistic world in the wild light of the Dionysian orgy. It appears to teem with energy, abundance, and life, whereas the contemporary world is regarded as suffering from the allegedly Christian belief that man is the center of the universe, the sole focus of a lone creator.
