= Vitalie Rimbaud =

French writer (1825–1907)

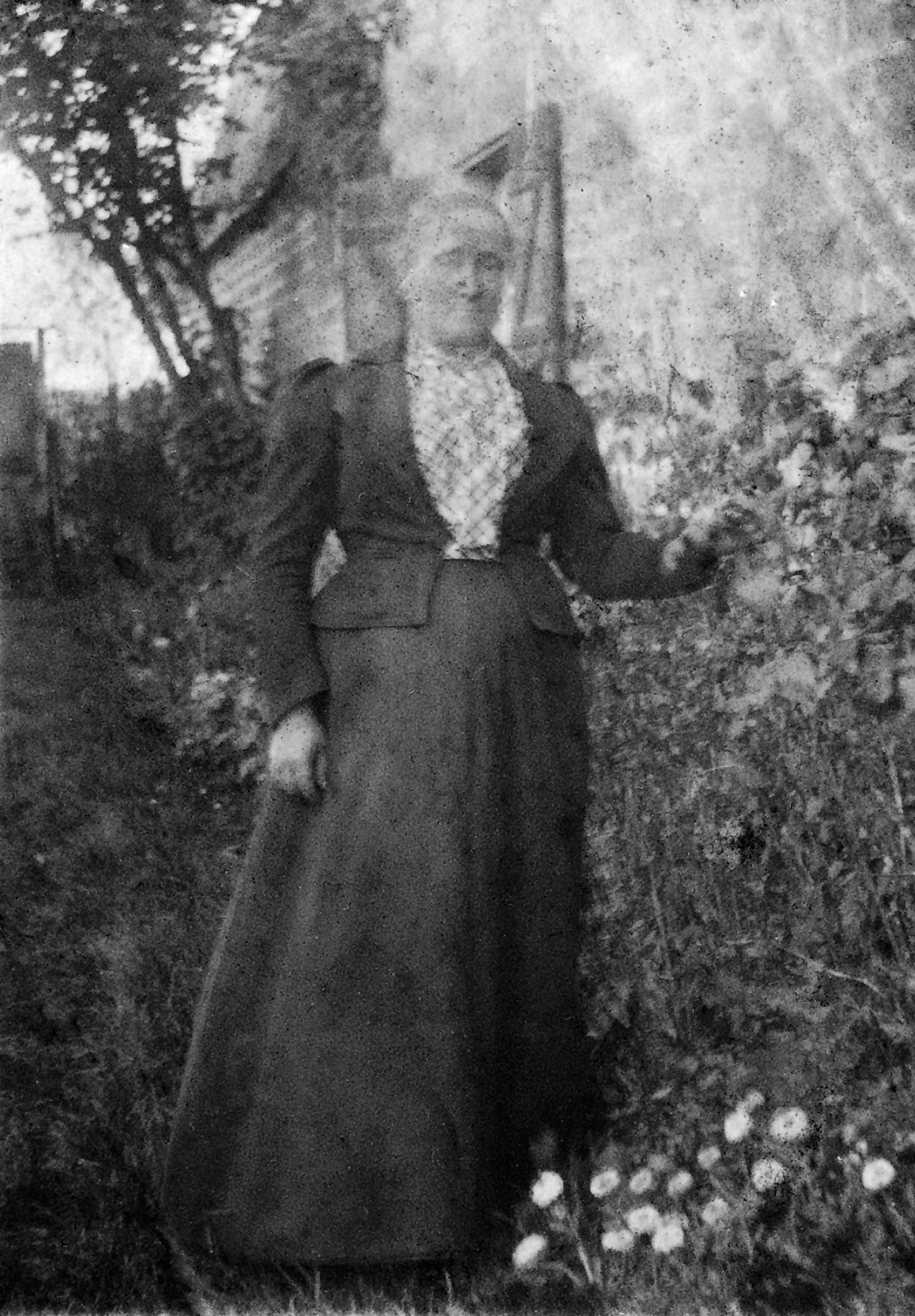
- circa 1890
- Born: Marie Catherine Vitalie Cuif; 10 March 1825
- Died: 16 November 1907 (aged 82)
- Spouse: Frédéric Rimbaud
- Children: Nicholas Frédéric Rimbaud; Arthur Rimbaud; Victorine Pauline Vitalie Rimbaud; Vitalie Rimbaud (1858–1875); Isabelle Rimbaud

Marie Catherine Vitalie Rimbaud, born Cuif, was better known simply as Vitalie Rimbaud, and was the mother of the visionary poet Arthur Rimbaud. She was born on 10 March 1825 and died on 16 November 1907. She met Captain Frédéric Rimbaud (1814–1878), a French infantry officer, in October 1852 and married him the following February. They had five children:

- Nicolas Frédéric ("Frédéric"), born 2 November 1853
- the poet, Jean Nicolas Arthur ("Arthur"), born 20 October 1854
- Victorine Pauline Vitalie, born 4 June 1857 (she died a few weeks later)
- Jeanne Rosalie Vitalie ("Vitalie"), born 15 June 1858
- Frédérique Marie Isabelle ("Isabelle"), born 1 June 1860.

Though the marriage lasted seven years, her husband lived continuously in the matrimonial home for less than three months, from February to May 1853. The rest of the time Captain Rimbaud's military postings – including service in the Crimean War and the Sardinian Campaign – meant he returned home to Charleville only when on leave. He was not at home for his children's births, nor their baptisms. After Isabelle's birth in 1860, Captain Rimbaud never returned to the family home. After their separation, Mme, Rimbaud called herself "Widow Rimbaud".
