= Frédéric Rimbaud =

French Army officer (1814–1878)

Frédéric Rimbaud (7 October 1814 – 16 November 1878) was a French officer of the 47^{th} Infantry Regiment. He served in the conquest of Algeria, the Crimean War and the Sardinian Campaign. He is best known as the father of the poet Arthur Rimbaud, though the two were not close by any means.

== Biography ==
=== Early life ===
Rimbaud was born in Dole in the department of Jura, the son of Didier Rimbaud (19 April 1786 in Dijon – 16 November 1878 in Dole), a tailor and merchant, and Catherine Taillandier (19 May 1786 – 30 November 1838). Not much can be attested for certain about his upbringing and formative years.

A Burgundian of Provençal extraction, he was a captain in the 47th Regiment of Infantry; he had risen from the ranks, and he had spent much of his service outside France. From 1844 to 1850, he participated in the conquest of Algeria and on 9 April 1854 was awarded as a Knight of the Legion of Honour 'by Imperial decree".

Rimbaud was described as 'good-tempered, easy-going and generous'. He had literary ambitions, had written guides for Arabic learners, poetry in his youth, and had even translated the Quran into French. Arthur Rimbaud would later refer to his father's collations for his own Arabic studies.

In October 1852, Rimbaud, then 38, was transferred to Mézières.

=== Personal life and death ===
In Mézières, while on a Sunday stroll, Rimbaud met his future wife, Marie Catherine Vitalie Cuif. She was 27. On 8 February 1853, they married. They had five children:

- Nicolas Frédéric ("Frédéric"), 2 November 1853 – 2 July 1911
- Jean Nicolas Arthur ("Arthur"), born 20 October 1854
- Victorine-Pauline-Vitalie, born 4 June 1857 (she died a few weeks later)
- Jeanne-Rosalie-Vitalie ("Vitalie"), born 15 June 1858
- Frédérique Marie Isabelle ("Isabelle"), born 1 June 1860.

Though the marriage lasted seven years, Rimbaud lived continuously in the matrimonial home for less than three months, from February to May 1853. The rest of the time his military postings – including service in the Crimean War and the Sardinian Campaign (and earning medals for both) – meant he returned home to Charleville only when on leave. He was not at home for his children's births, neither was he for their baptisms. After Isabelle's birth in 1860, Rimbaud never returned to the family home. After their separation, his now-former wife Vitalie referred to herself as "Widow Rimbaud".

Rimbaud left the army in 1864, retiring to Dijon. He died there fourteen years later.
