= Georges Izambard =

French rhetoric professor

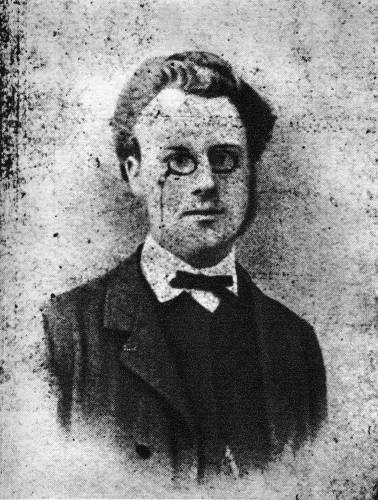
Georges Izambard about 1890, photographer unknown

Georges Alphonse Fleury Izambard (French pronunciation: [ʒɔʁʒ alfɔ̃s flœʁi izɑ̃baʁ]; 11 December 1848 in Paris – February 1931) was a French lycée professor of rhetoric and alumnus of prestigious École normale supérieure, best known as the teacher and benefactor of poet Arthur Rimbaud. He was a renowned journalist and close friend of Renoir after he left teaching. He taught at the Collège de Charleville in Charleville, where his nickname was "Zanzibar".

On 4 May 1870, Rimbaud's mother wrote to Izambard to complain about him giving Rimbaud Victor Hugo's Les Misérables to read. In May 1871, Rimbaud sent an important letter to Izambard. In this letter, (which includes the poem "Le Cœur supplicié"), he affirms that he wants to be a poet, and that he is working to become a "voyant":

Je veux être poète, et je travaille à me rendre voyant : vous ne comprendrez pas du tout, et je ne saurais presque vous expliquer. Il s'agit d'arriver à l'inconnu par le dérèglement de tous les sens. Les souffrances sont énormes, mais il faut être fort, être né poète, et je me suis reconnu poète. Ce n'est pas du tout ma faute. C'est faux de dire : Je pense : on devrait dire : On me pense. − Pardon du jeu de mots. − Je est un autre. Tant pis pour le bois qui se trouve violon, et nargue aux inconscients, qui ergotent sur ce qu'ils ignorent tout à fait !

Translated:

I wish to be a poet, and I am working to make myself into a seer: you will not understand at all, and I would not nearly know how to explain it to you. It's a question of coming to the unknown through the disordering of all the senses. The suffering is enormous, but one must be strong, be born a poet, and I have come to terms with my destiny as a poet. It's not at all my fault. It's wrong to say "I think"; one ought to say "I am being thought" - Forgive the play on words - I is another. Too bad for the wood which finds itself a violin, and brush off the oblivious, who quibble over things they know nothing about!

== Published works ==
- Izambard, Georges (2010), Rimbaud Tel Que Je l Ai Connu (in French), Rennes: Éditions La Part Commune, ISBN 978-2844281388

== Sources ==
- Lefrère, Jean-Jacques (2001), Arthur Rimbaud (in French), Paris: Fayard, ISBN 978-2-213-60691-0
- Lefrère, Jean-Jacques (2007), Correspondance de Rimbaud (in French), Paris: Fayard, ISBN 978-2-213-63391-6
- Nicholl, Charles (1999), Somebody Else: Arthur Rimbaud in Africa 1880–91, Chicago: University of Chicago Press, ISBN 0-226-58029-6
- Robb, Graham (2000), Rimbaud, New York: W.W. Norton & Co, ISBN 978-0330482820
- Starkie, Enid (1973), Arthur Rimbaud, London: Faber and Faber, ISBN 0-571-10440-1
- White, Edmund (2008), Rimbaud: The Double Life of a Rebel, London: Grove, ISBN 978-1-84354-971-0
