= Grande Étude de perfectionnement =

Compositions for piano by Franz Liszt

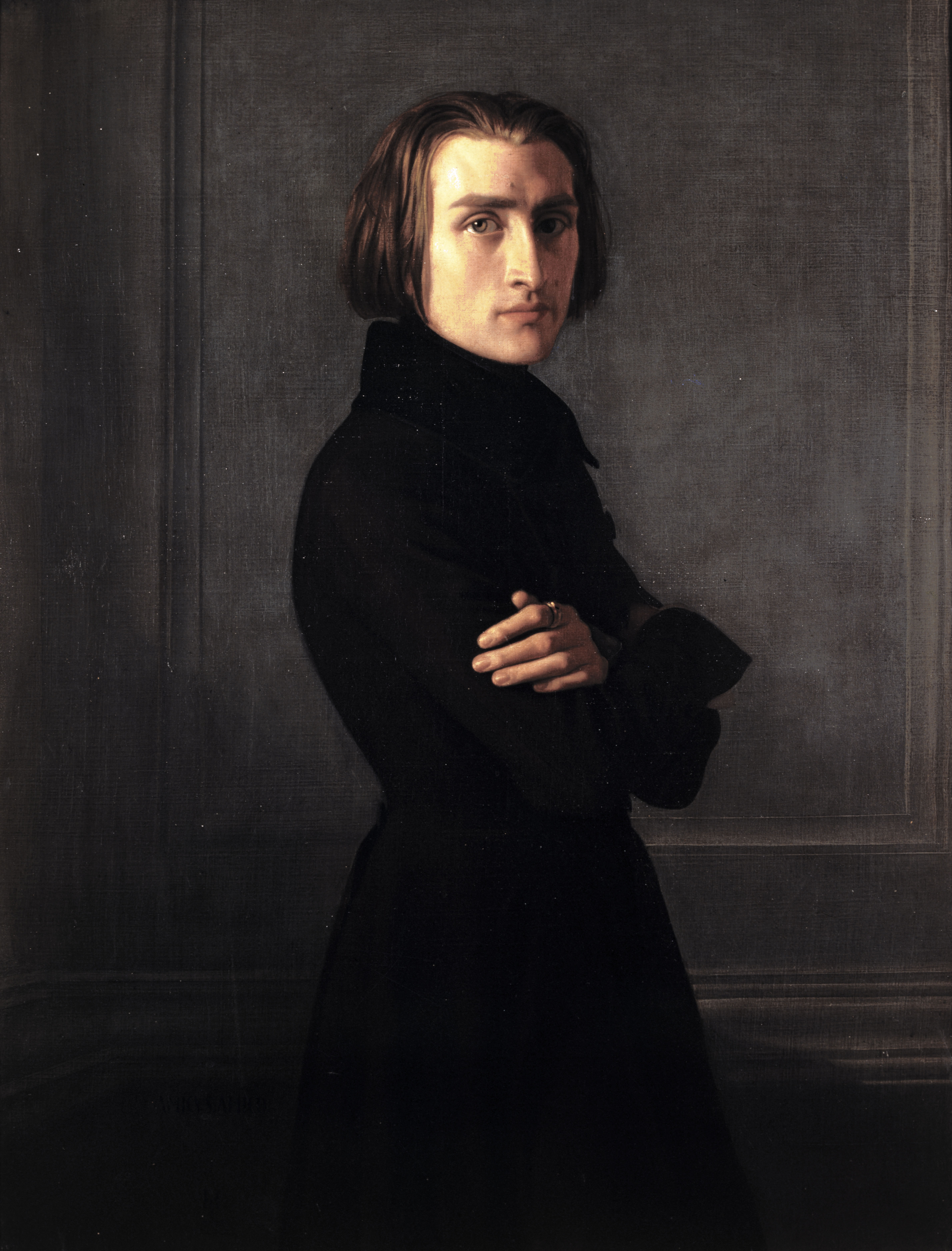
Portrait of Franz Liszt by Henri Lehmann, 1839

Étude de perfectionnement de la Méthode des méthodes are two pieces by the Hungarian composer Franz Liszt, composed in 1842 and 1852. The first piece is called Morceau de salon, S.142, followed by a revision, Ab Irato, S.143, both composed in E minor. They are regarded as eccentric pieces with beautiful interludes of arpeggiated figures, though both are rarely performed.

Humphrey Searle dates the original composition to 1840. The work echoes and has similarity to Liszt's later composition Les Préludes.

The first edition was composed as a contribution for the book "Méthode des méthodes de piano" by Ignaz Moscheles and François-Joseph Fétis. Frédéric Chopin's Trois nouvelles études are also a part of the set.
