= Saint-Merri =

Church located in Paris, France

Église Saint-Merri or Église Saint-Merry
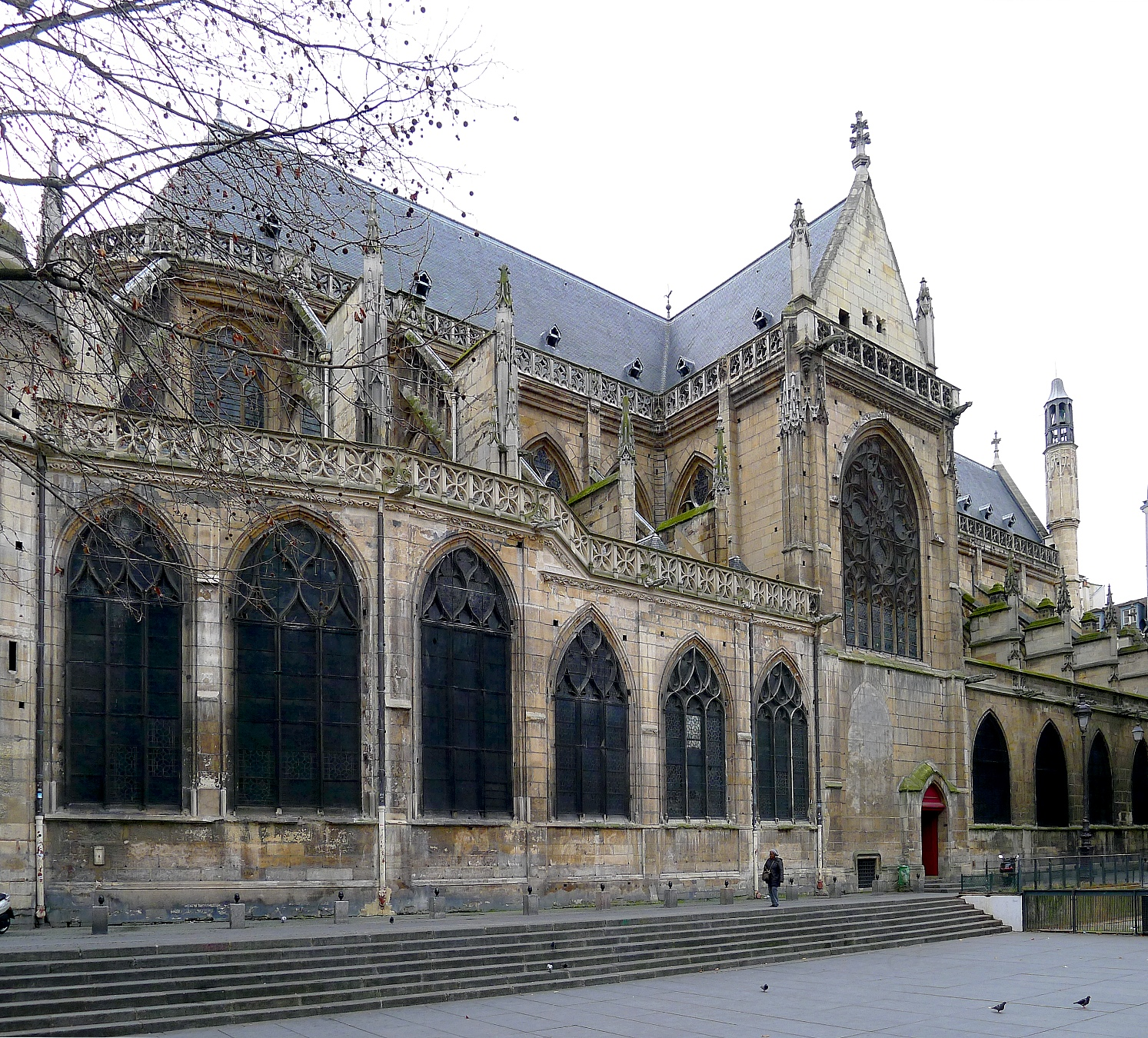
- Saint-Merri, north facade

Religion
- Affiliation: Catholic Church
- Province: Archdiocese of Paris
- Region: Île-de-France
- Rite: Roman Rite
- Status: Active

Location
- Location: 76 Rue de la Verrerie, 4e
- State: France
- Interactive map of Église Saint-Merri or Église Saint-Merry
- Coordinates: 48°51′32″N 2°21′04″E

Architecture
- Type: Parish church
- Style: French gothic
- Groundbreaking: 1685
- Completed: 1690
- Monument historique
- Official name: Eglise Saint-Merri
- Designated: 1862
- Reference no.: PA00086259
- Denomination: Église

Website
- http://saintmerry.org/

The Church of Saint-Merri or Église Saint-Merry) is a parish church in Paris, located near the Centre Pompidou along the rue Saint Martin, in the 4th arrondissement on the Rive Droite (Right Bank). It is dedicated to the 7th century abbot of Autun Abbey, Saint Mederic, who came to Paris on pilgrimage and later died there in the year 700. In 884 Mederic was declared patron saint of the Right Bank.

== History ==
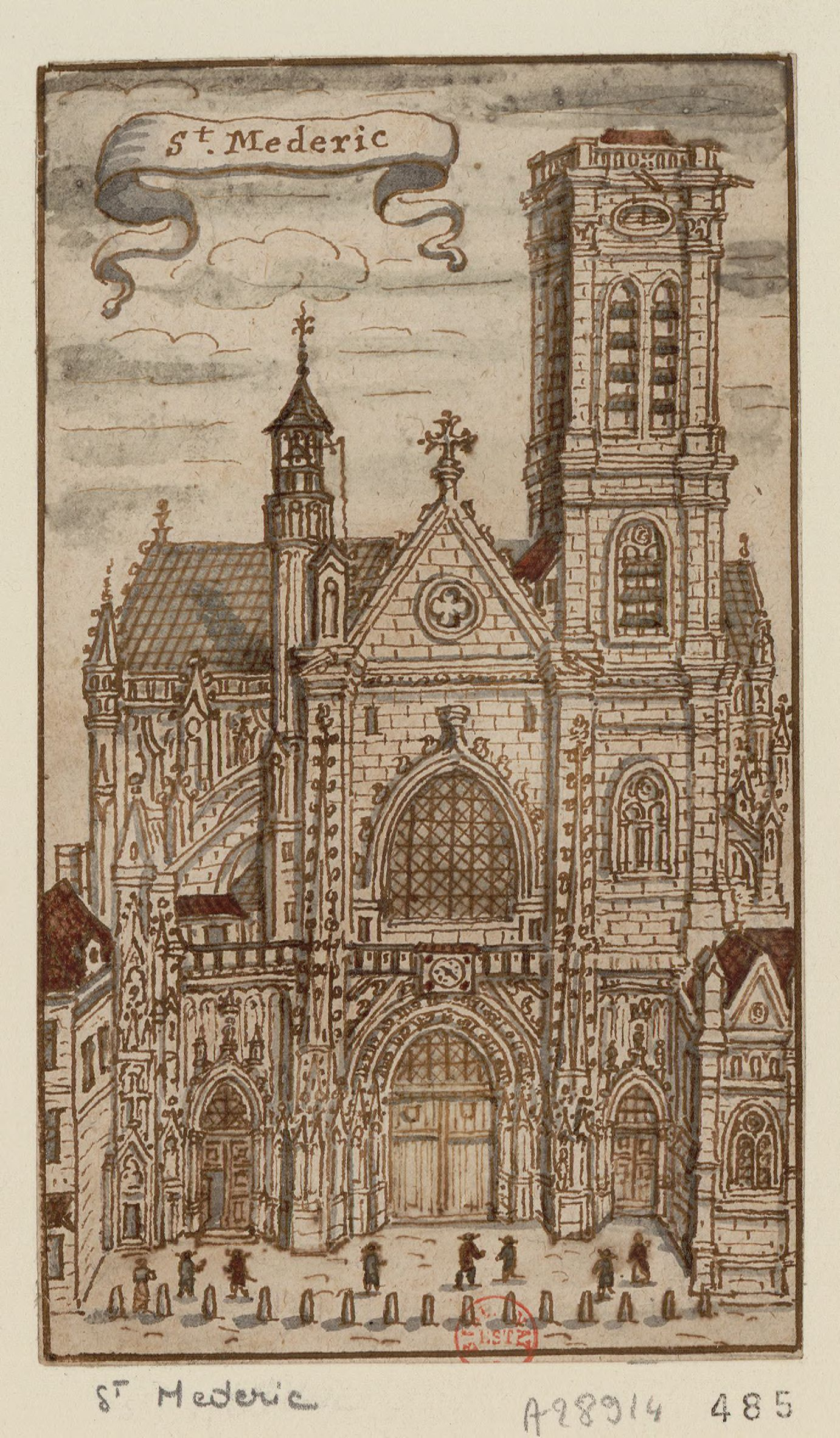
Church of Saint-Merri in the 17th century

A small chapel, called Saint-Pierre-des-Bois, existed in what was then a clearing. In about 700 AD. Saint Merri was buried there. Mederic, the future Saint Merri, was born in Autun in Burgundy, and is believed to have lived in the Benedictine Abbey there. He later went into the desert as a hermit. On his return, he moved to Paris, because he wished to live near the Tomb of Saint Symphorien, founder of the Abbey of Autun, which was within the church of the Abbey of Saint-Germain-des-Prés in Paris. In 884 he was chosen as the patron saint of the Right Bank of Paris. In about 890 Joscelin, the Bishop of Paris, had his remains exhumed, and a particularly rich reliquary created for him; the church was constructed to contain it. Gradually it became known simply as Saint Merri.

As the neighbourhood grew into an important commercial district, the church became too small. A new church was built upon the same site in about 1200, but this also soon became too small. The present church was begun under King Francois I in about 1520, and finished in about 1560. Though it was built in the middle of the Renaissance, the builders used the Flamboyant or late Gothic style for it.

In the 18th century, the church was gradually modified with elements of the classical style. The jubé, or rood screen, between the nave and the choir was removed, and the Gothic pillars were recovered with marble or stucco. The deeply-colored stained glass in upper windows of the nave and choir was replaced by clear glass, The pulpit is by P. A. Slodtz and was made in 1753. The bell tower contains one of the oldest bells in Paris, cast in 1331, which survived the French Revolution.

From the 11th century onwards, Saint-Merry was closely associated with Notre Dame de Paris. All seven of the canons of the church came from the cathedral. It became known, along with three other churches, as the "Daughter" of Notre Dame, and is the only one still having that status today.

The church was badly damaged during the French Revolution. The Chapter was abolished and the building became for a time a gunpowder factory. It was returned to the church in 1795, and served for a time as the "Temple of Commerce." In 1832, It was again in the midst of barricade fighting during a republican uprising against the July Monarchy.

The organ was reconstructed in 1781 by François-Henri Clicquot, the famous organ builder. It was played by Camille Saint-Saëns, who was organist of the church from 1853 to 1857.

The church is now home to the Halles-Beaubourg Pastoral Centre. It also is the base of Académie vocale de Paris, which performs concerts in the church every Saturday throughout the year.

== Exterior ==
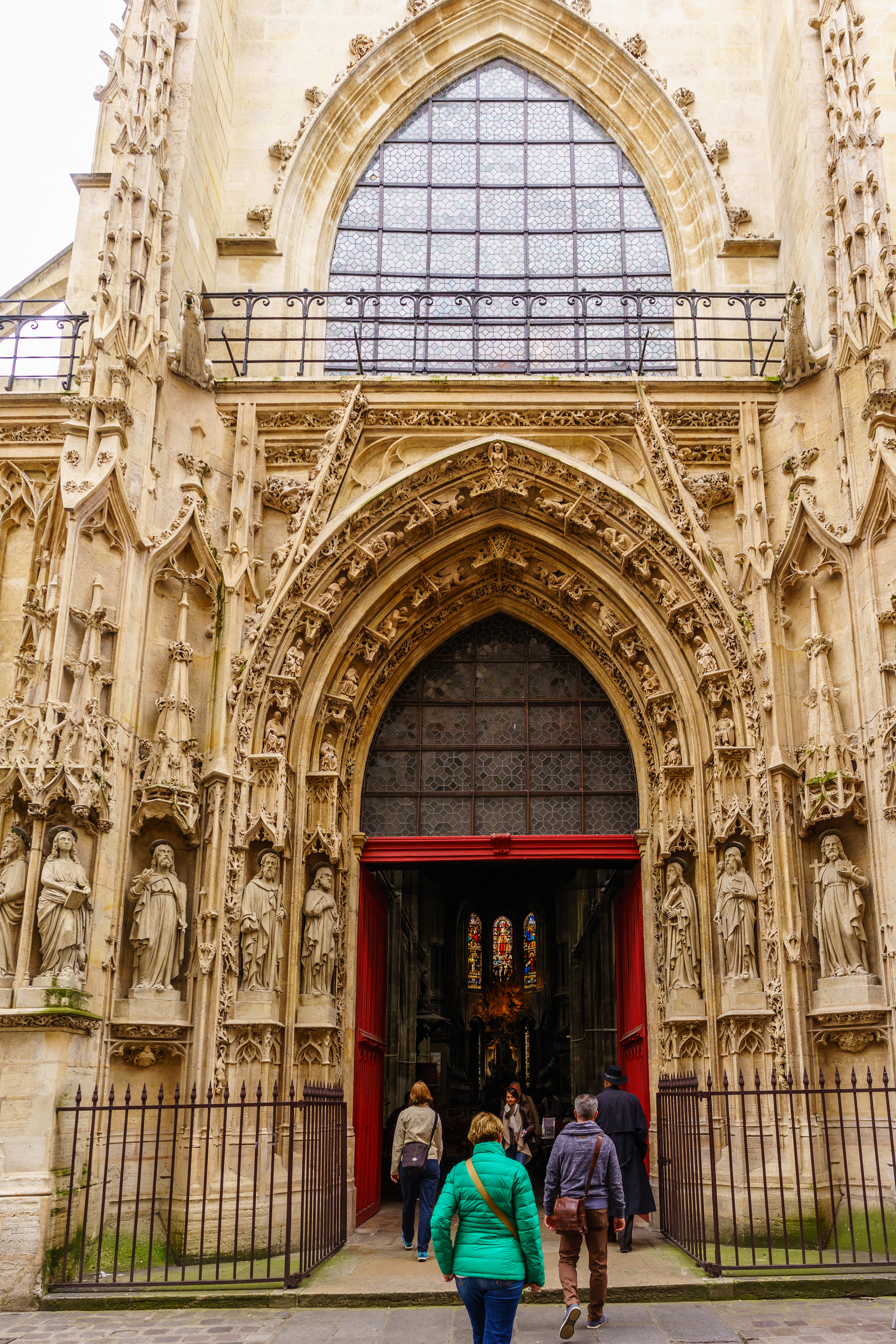
The flamboyant west portal

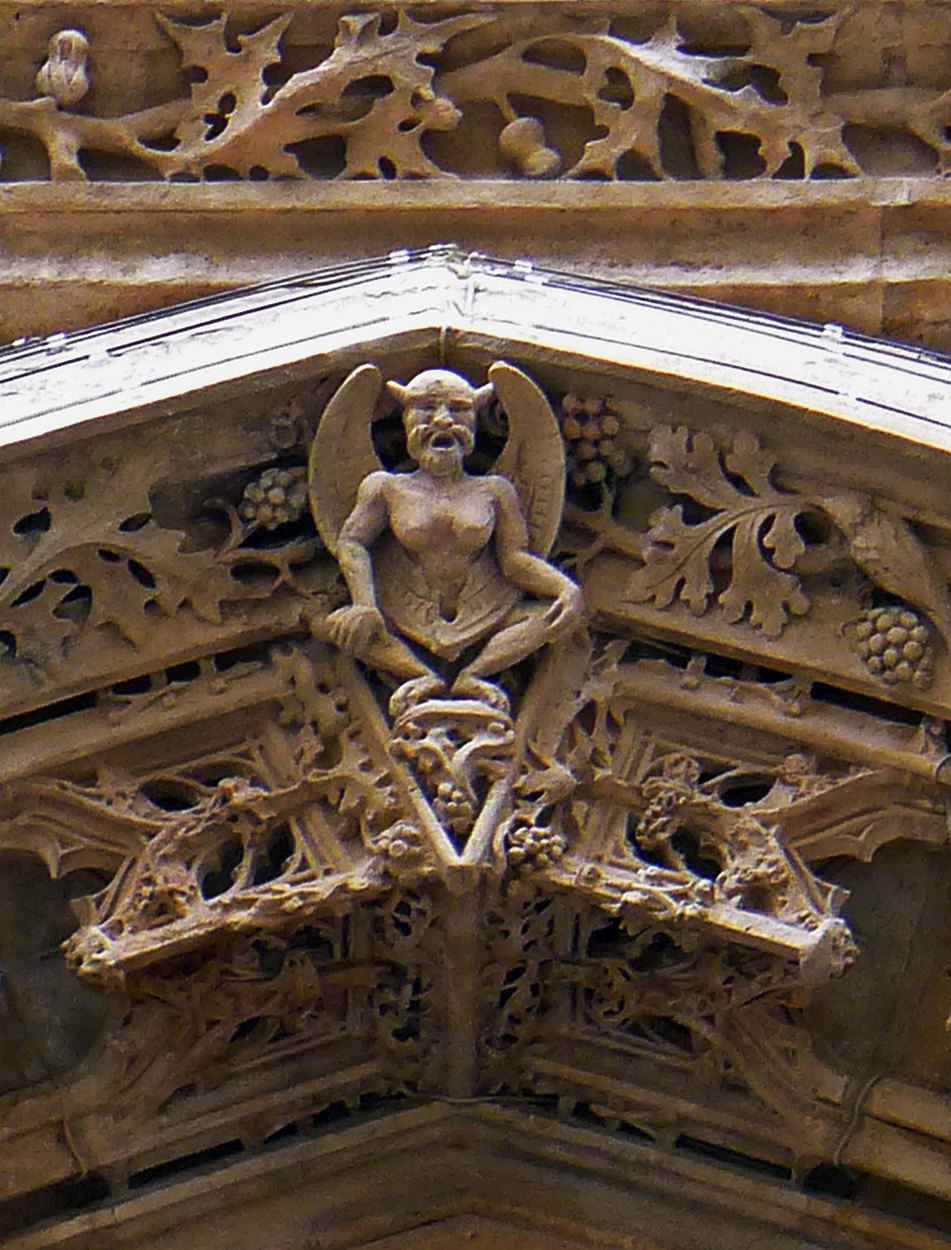
The mythical figure at the top of the west portal (19th c.)

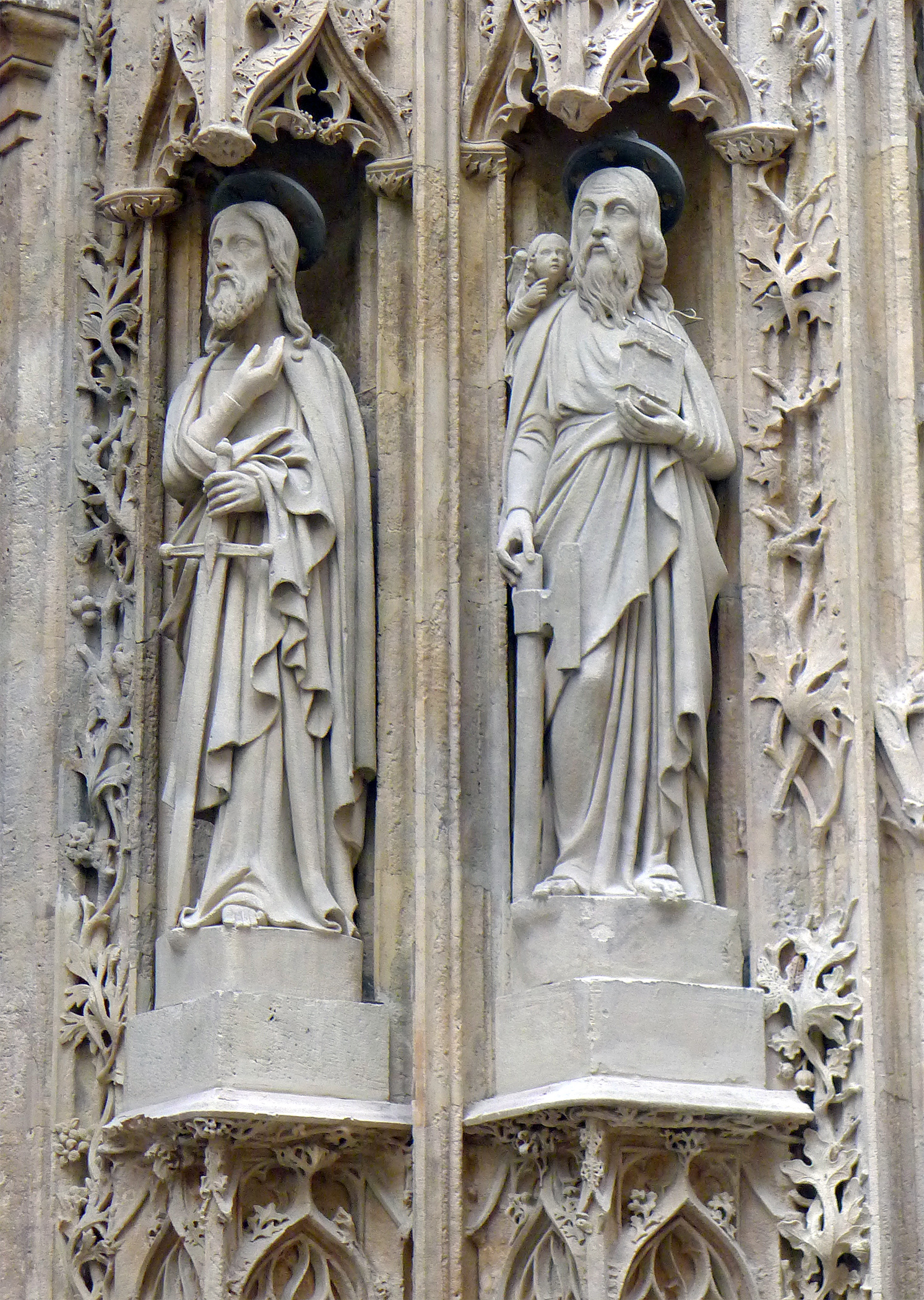
Detail of west portal sculpture (19th c.)

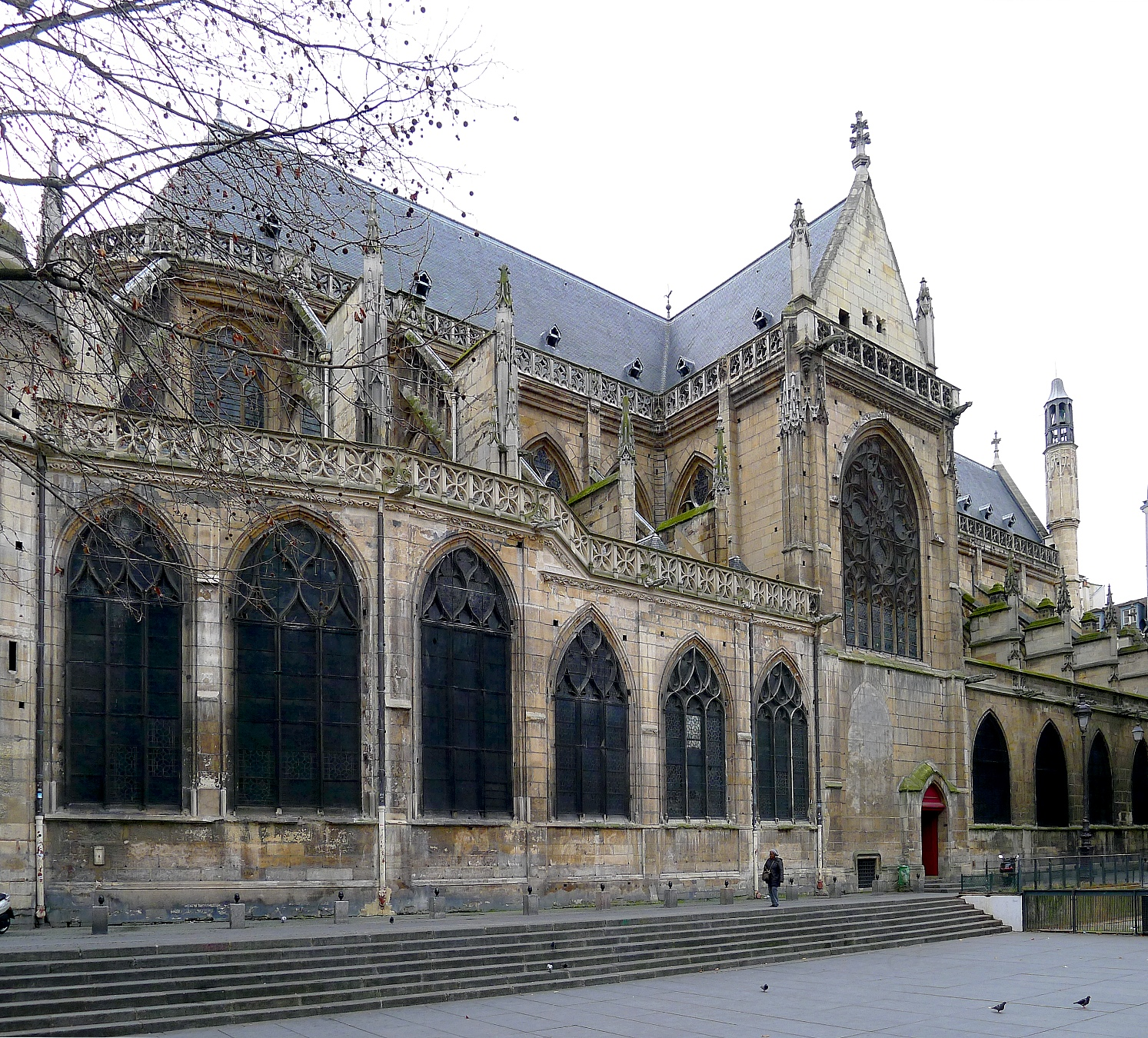
The north facade and transept

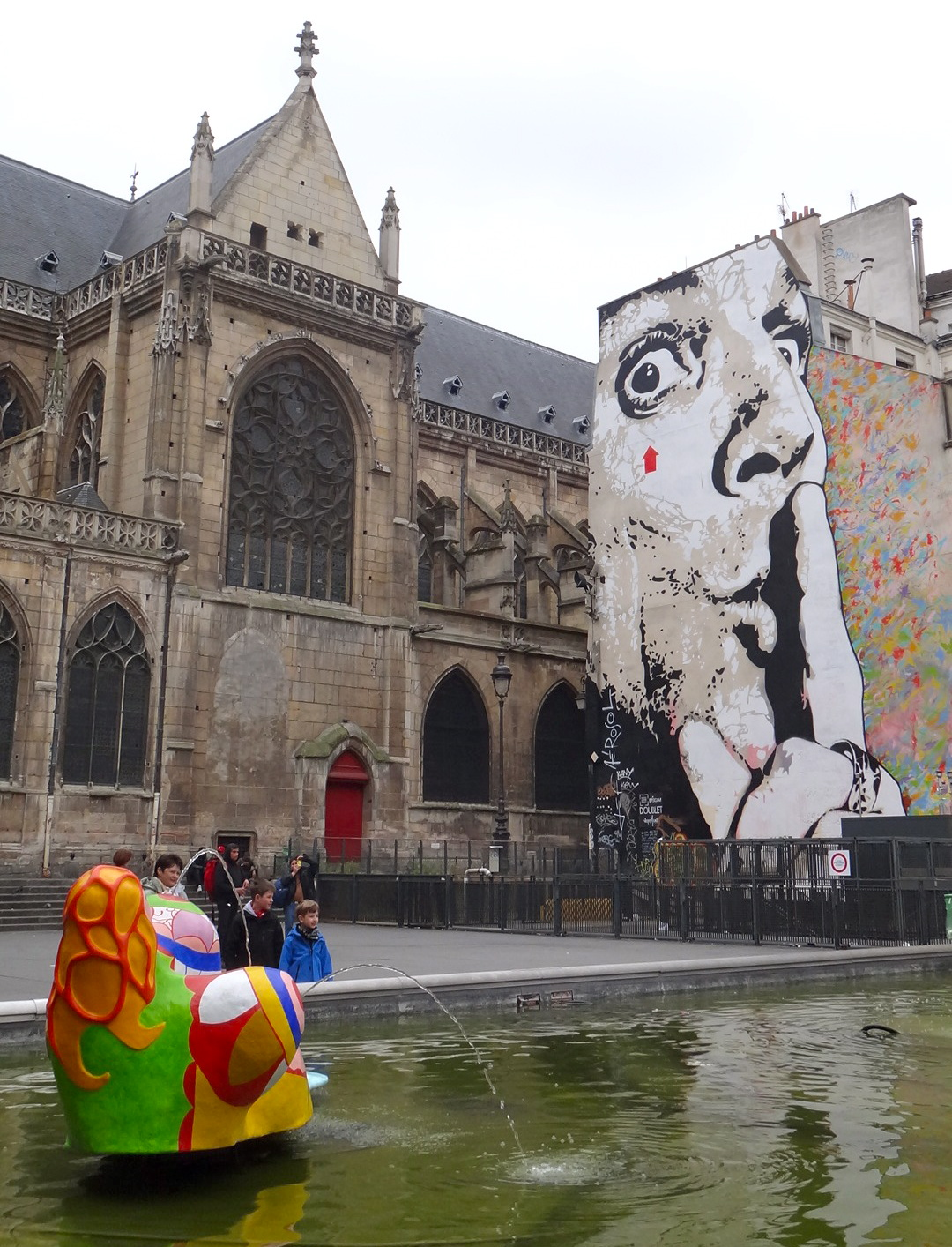
The transept, competing with art from the Centre Pompidou

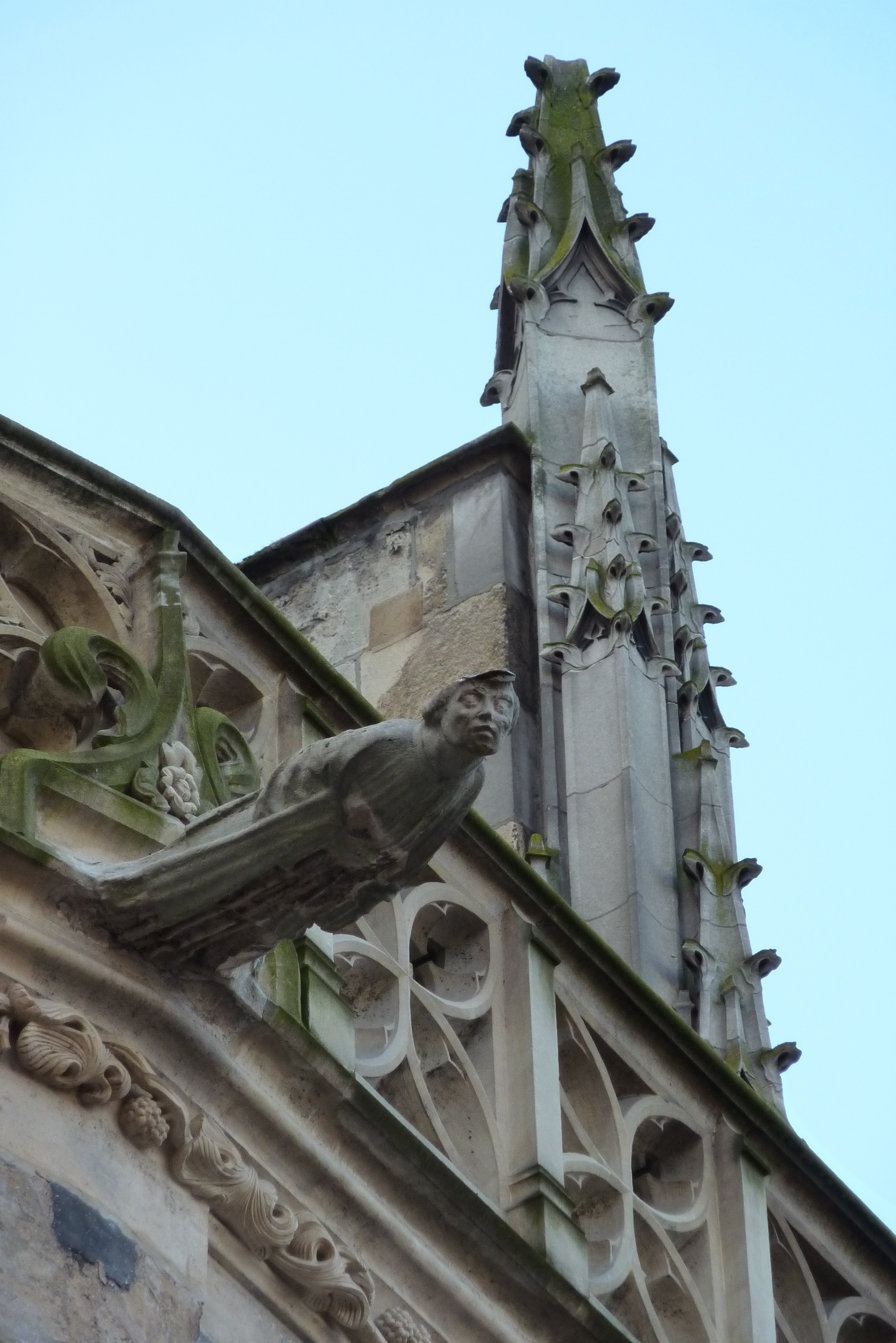
Flamboyant pinnacle and a whimsical gargoyle

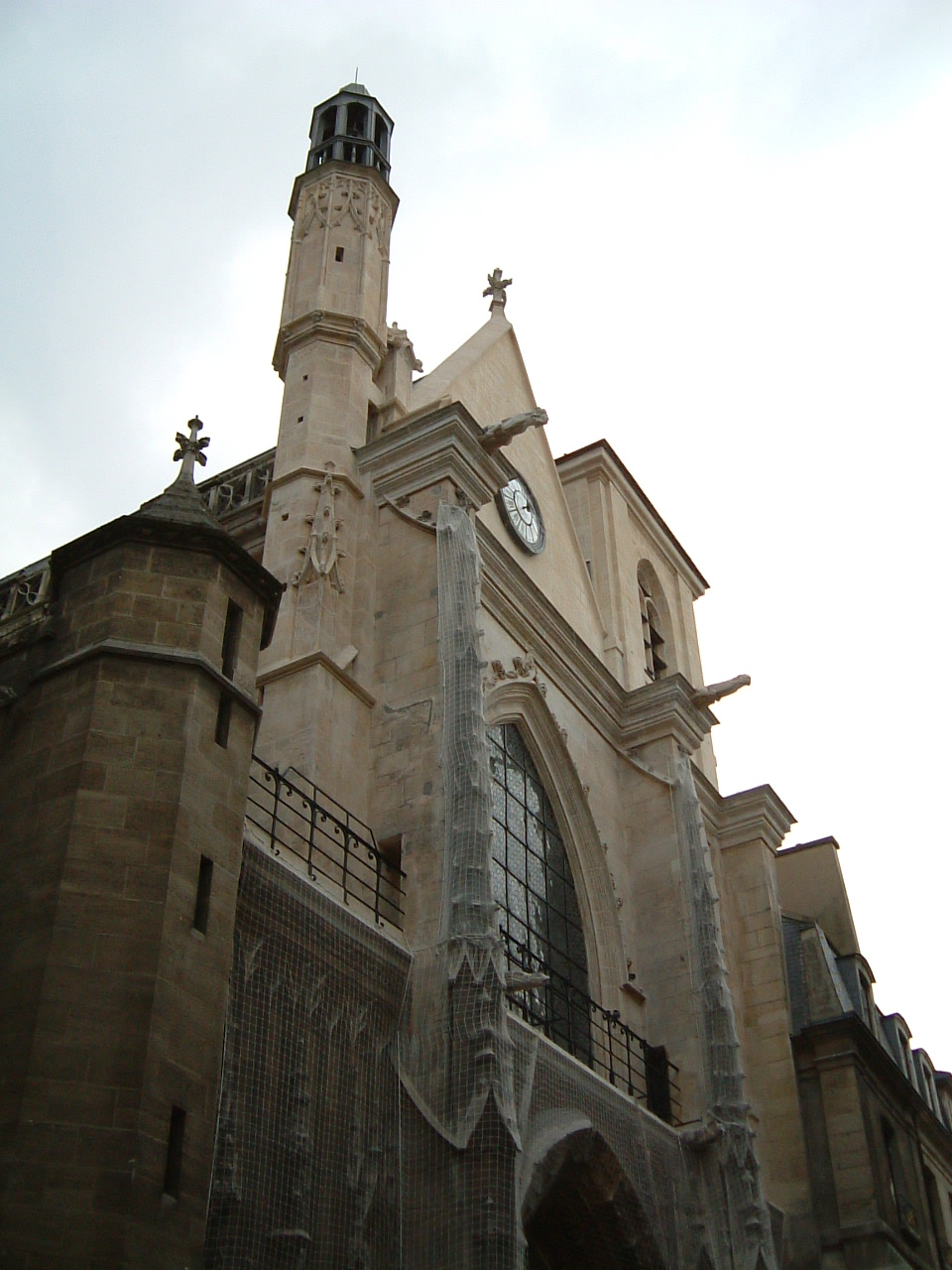
Campanile (left) and shortened old tower (right) on south side

Though the church was built in the midst of the Baroque period, its architecture is predominantly Flamboyant or late Gothic, with an abundance of floral and vegetal carved decoration, as well as sculptures of fantastic creatures, particularly on the door and window casings. The church is pressed by large buildings which almost hide three sides; a house from the same period is attached to the right side of the church; this was the former residence of the canons of the church. However, its north side opens upon the terrace and sculpture garden of the Pompidou Center.

The original bell square bell tower on the south side was built two stories high. It was given a third level in 1612, but after a fire in 1871 it was reduced to its original height. On the left side is a more slender bell tower, with decorative arches. It contains one of the oldest church bells in Paris, from 1331.

The three portals on the west front are covered with a large pointed bay, and enclosed by two large buttresses. The sculpture on the west front is almost entirely from the time of King Louis-Philippe in the first half of the 19th century. The statues in the archway of the door on the west front are copies of those in the south transept facade of Notre-Dame-de-Paris. A few more modern sculptures were added on the upper levels, including cheerful images of a rabbit and a dog at the top of cornice, and an assortment of whimsical gargoyles.

== Interior ==
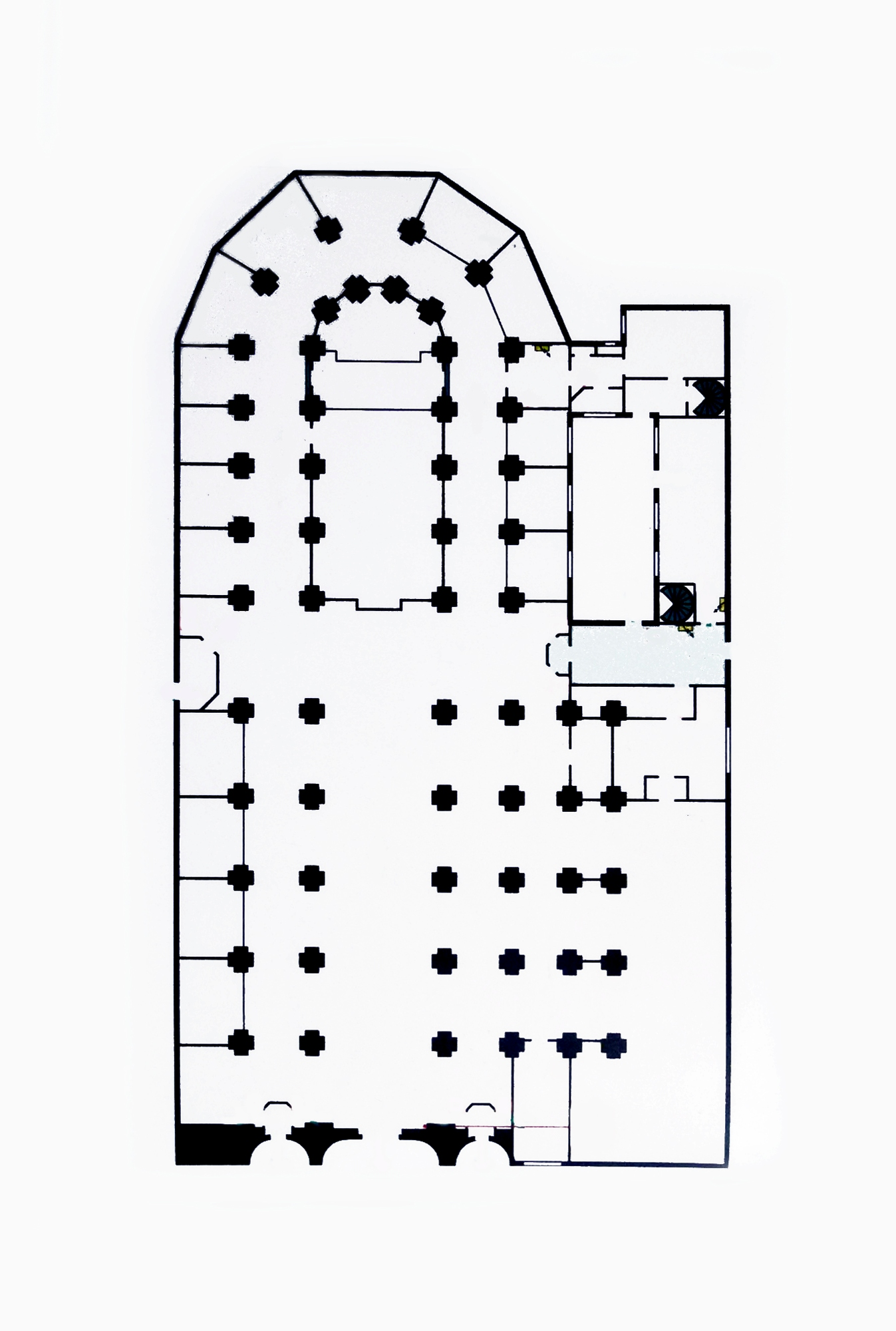
Plan of Saint-Merri

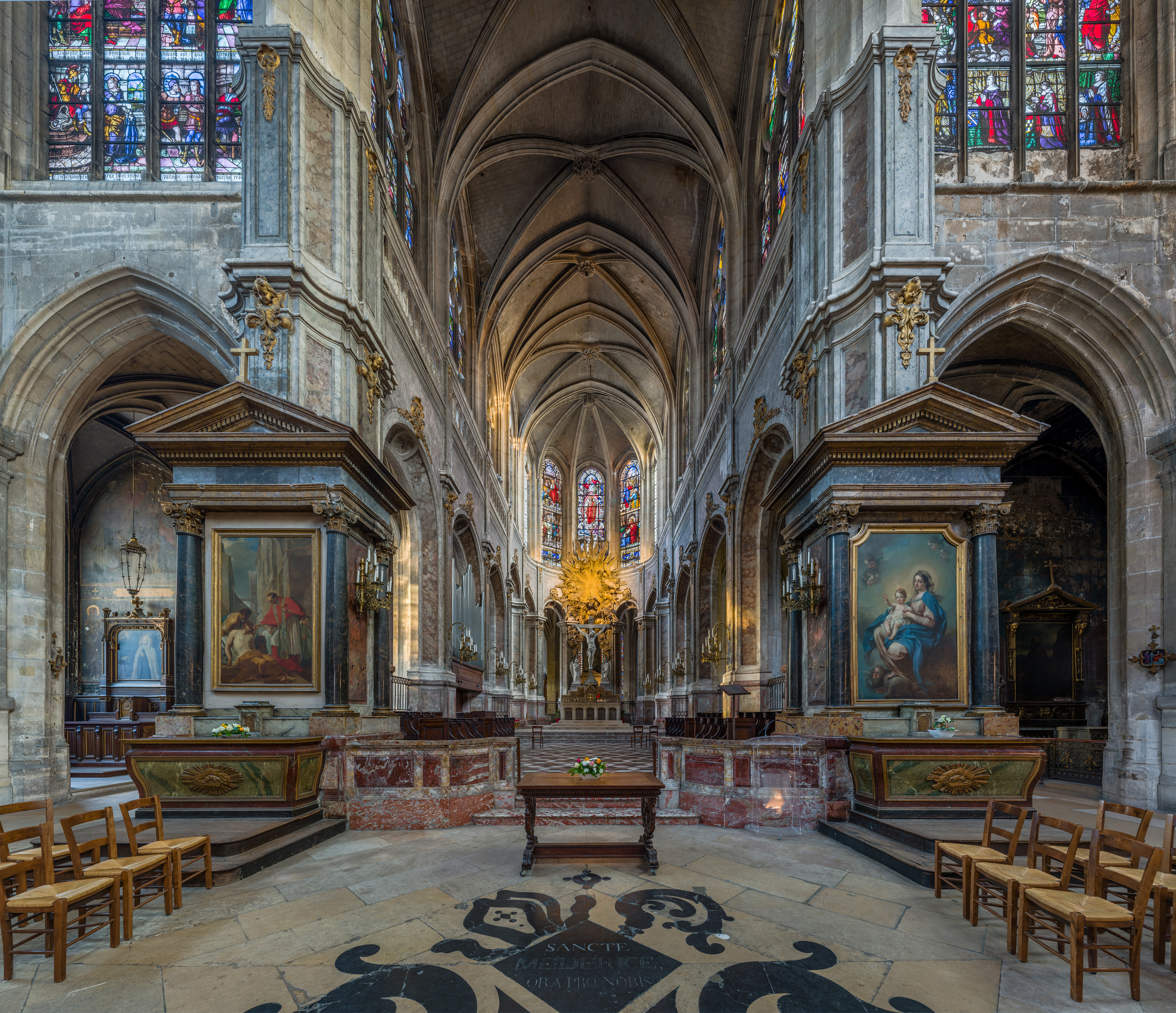
The Transept looking toward the choir and apse

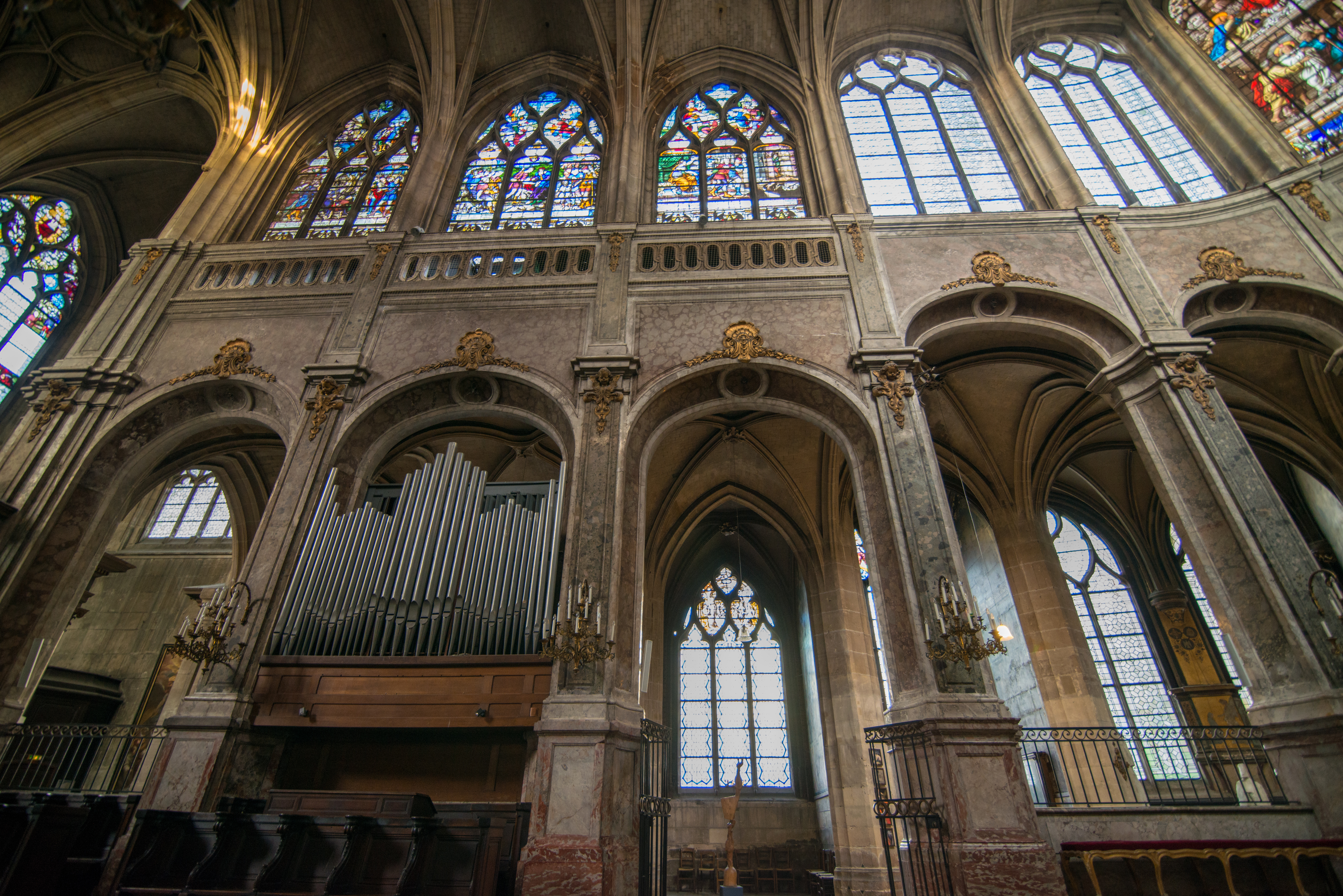
Upper windows, arcades and the organ of the choir

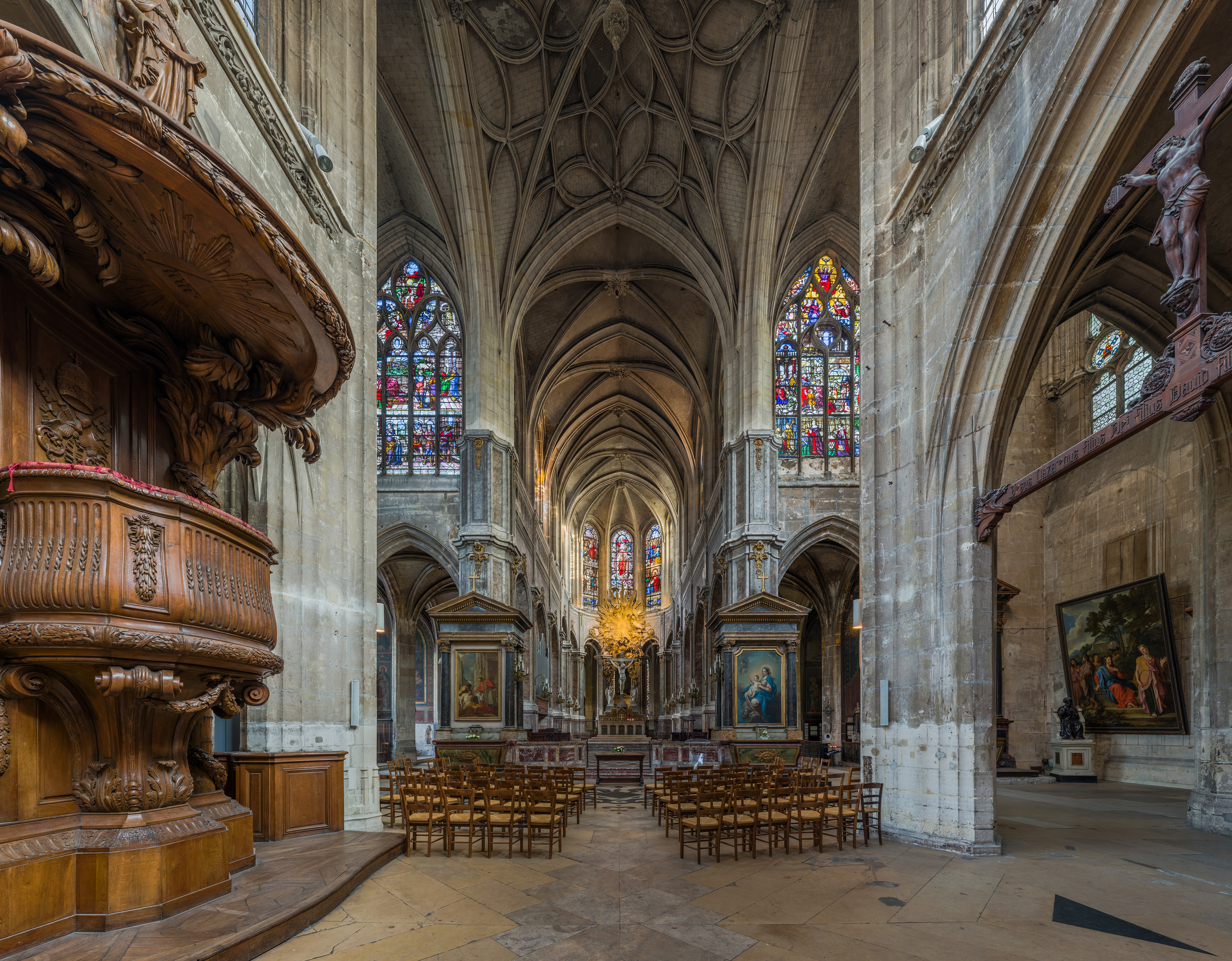
The pulpit in the nave, looking toward the choir

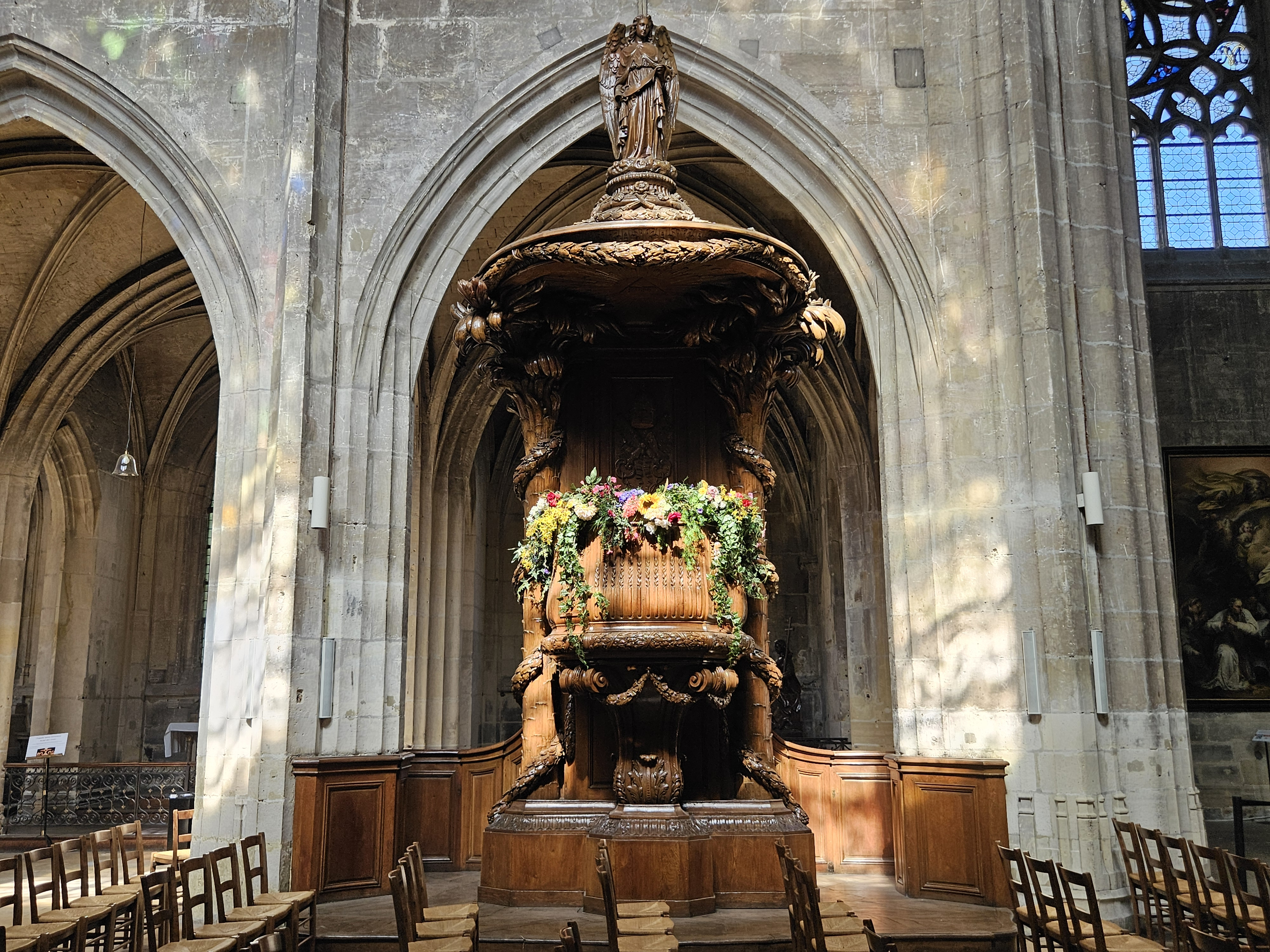
The front view of the pulpit in the nave

The interior of the church, like the exterior, shows Gothic architecture skilfully blended with Renaissance features and decoration. The slender Gothic pillars of the nave and choir which support the vaults have been transformed into Renaissance arcades with massive classical pillars, and abundant decoration. The walls and columns are covered with sculptural foliage, animals, and elongated statues of Biblical figures, including Saint Peter, Moses holding the Ten Commandments, and Saint Merri himself.

In about 1753, most of the stained glass was removed from the upper windows and replaced with white glass, giving the interior its exceptional brightness. The original pulpit was replaced between 1753 and 1761 with a much more ornate version, supported by two sculptured palm trees. It was made by Pierre-Alexis Hemon, following designs of the Slodtz brothers, whose work is found in many Paris churches of the period.

=== The Choir and altar ===
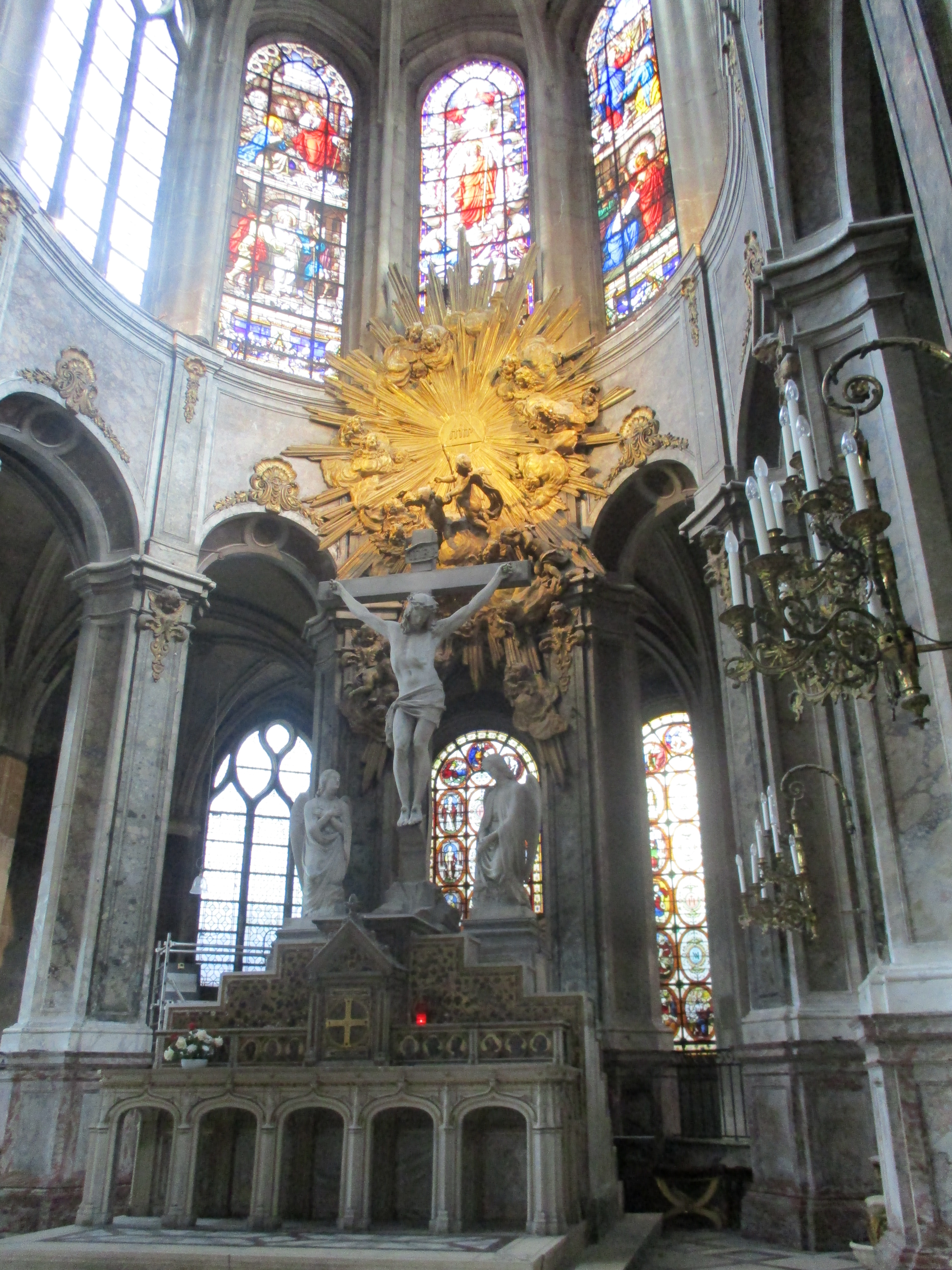
The altar in the choir, with its gilded "Gloire", or "Glory".

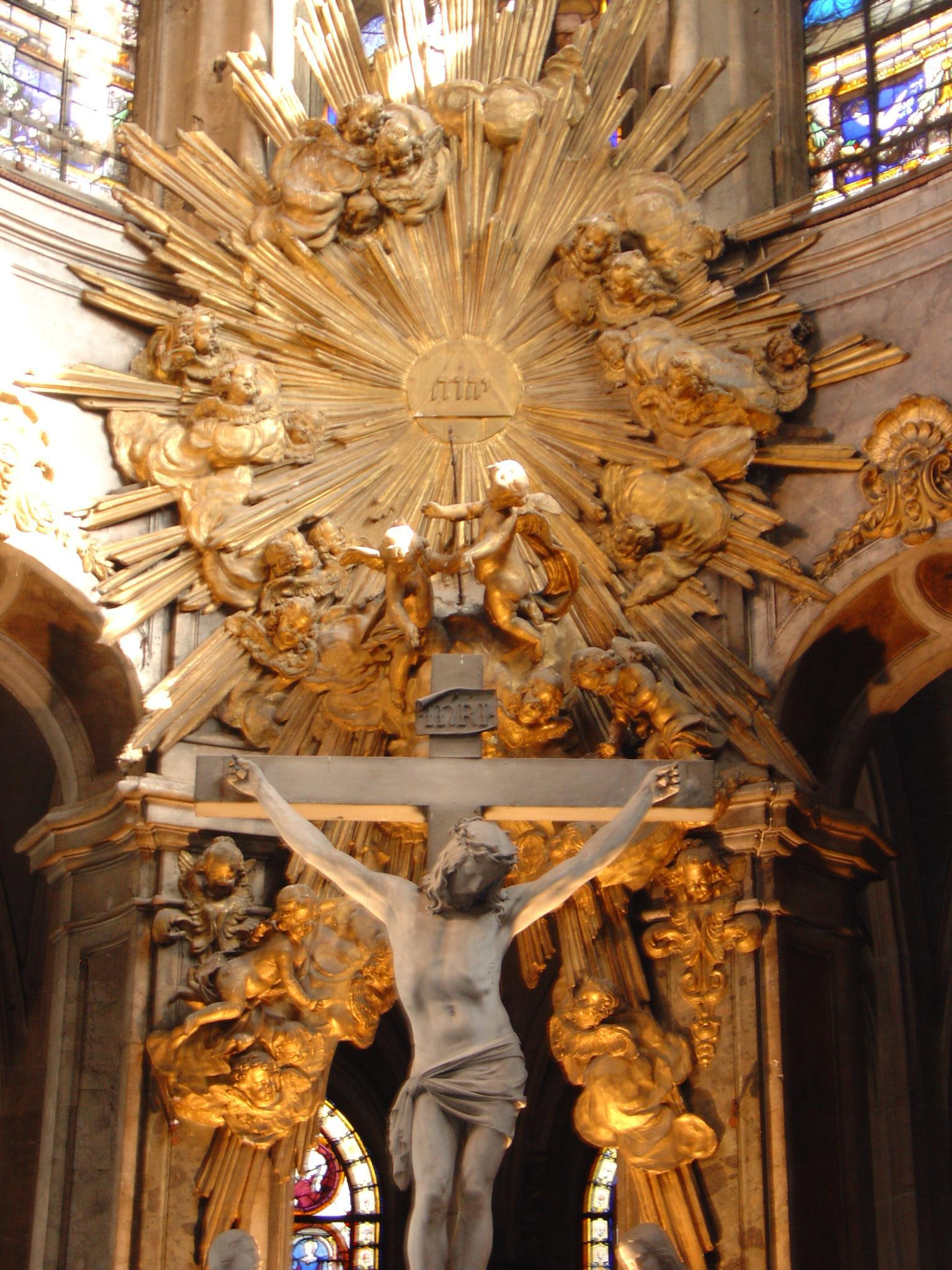
Detail of the "Glory" behind the altar

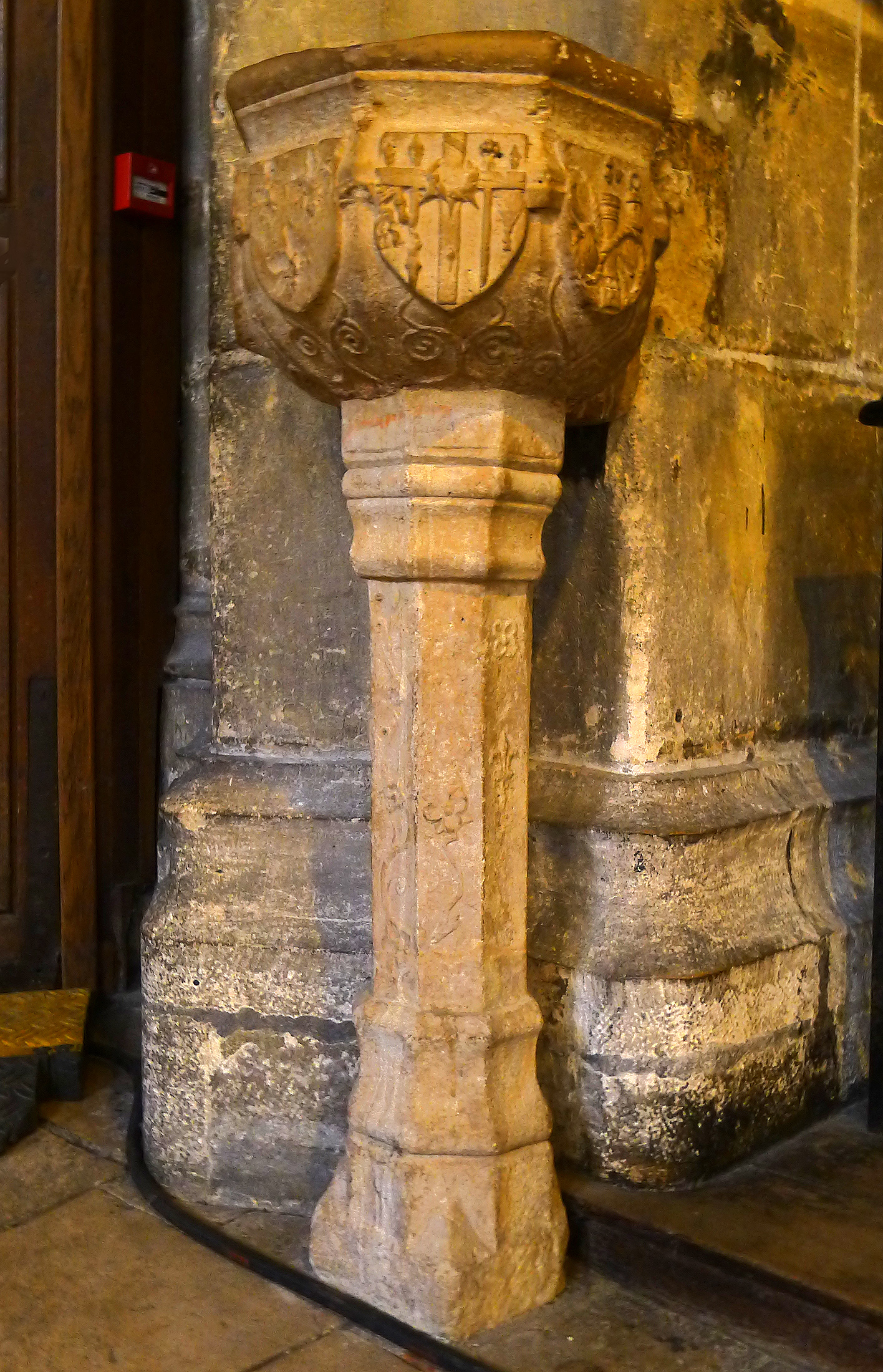
Baptismal font with emblems of Louis XII and Anne of Brittany (16th c.)

The choir, the portion of the church reserved for the Clergy, occupies about half of the total interior. It underwent a thorough remodelling into the Baroque style, with designs by the Slodtz brothers. This is most visible in the arcades with rounded arches, and the pillars covered with plaques of marble and stucco in different colors. The floor of the choir was also replaced with marble pavement.

The most imposing feature of the choir is the marble altar, which is dominated by a towering "Gloire", or "Glory" (1753), a sculptural work designed by the Slodtz brothers and made of gilded wood and decorated with the sculpted heads of cherubs. This was given further decoration in the 18th century by large painted panels behind the altar, by Henri Lehmann (1814-1882), showing the Apostles and heads of anagels, representing Joy and Sadness.

== Art and Decoration ==
Much of the art and decoration is found in the chapels that surround the nave and the choir, the disambulatory behind the altar, and in the transept. Some dates to the 17th century, while a large part comes from the 20th century, replacing art destroyed in the Revolution.

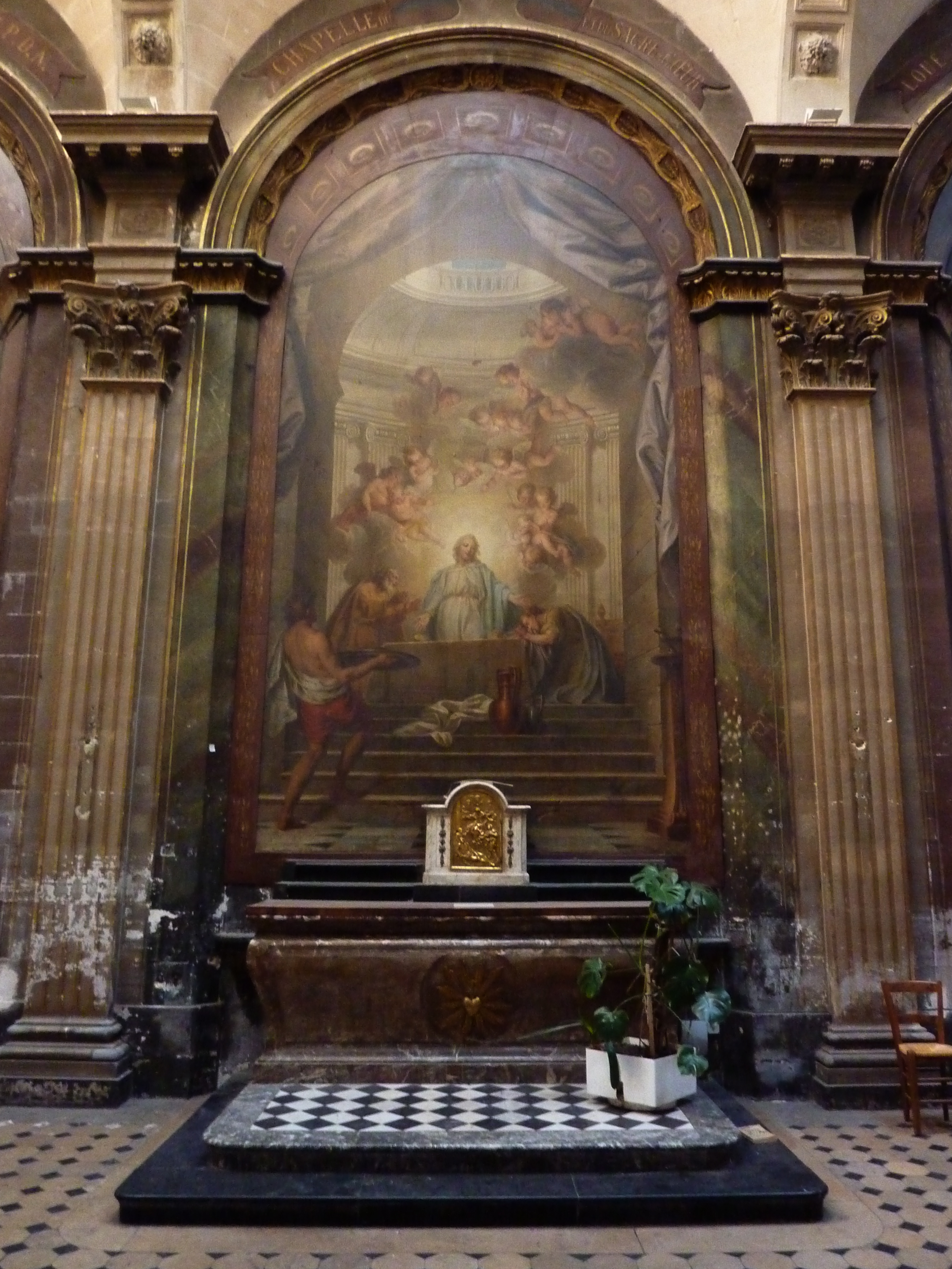
"The Pilgrims of Emmeaus" by Charles Coypel (1694-1792) (Chapel of the Communion)

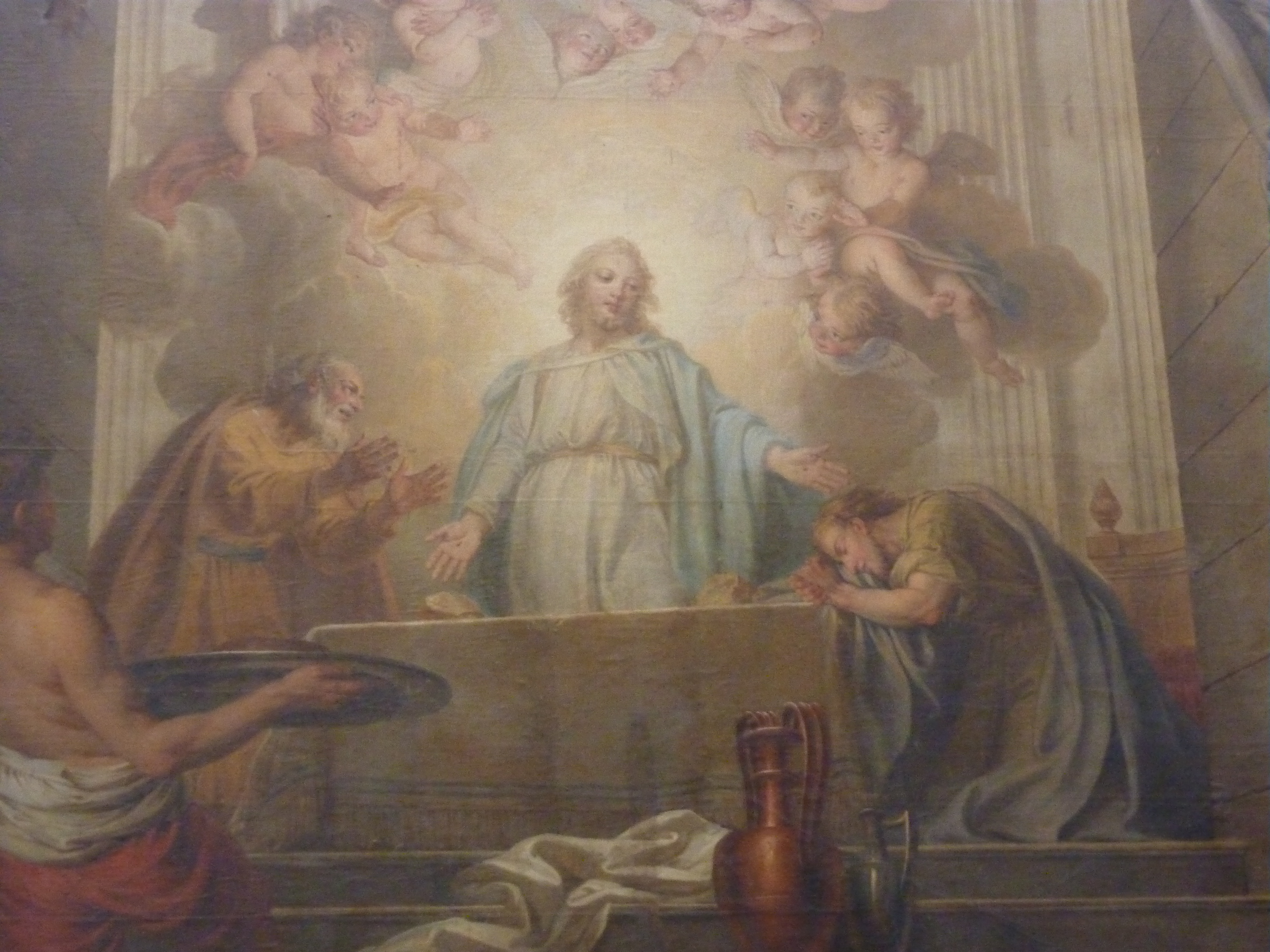
Detail of "The Pilgrims of Emmaus" by Charles Coypel (Chapel of the Communion)

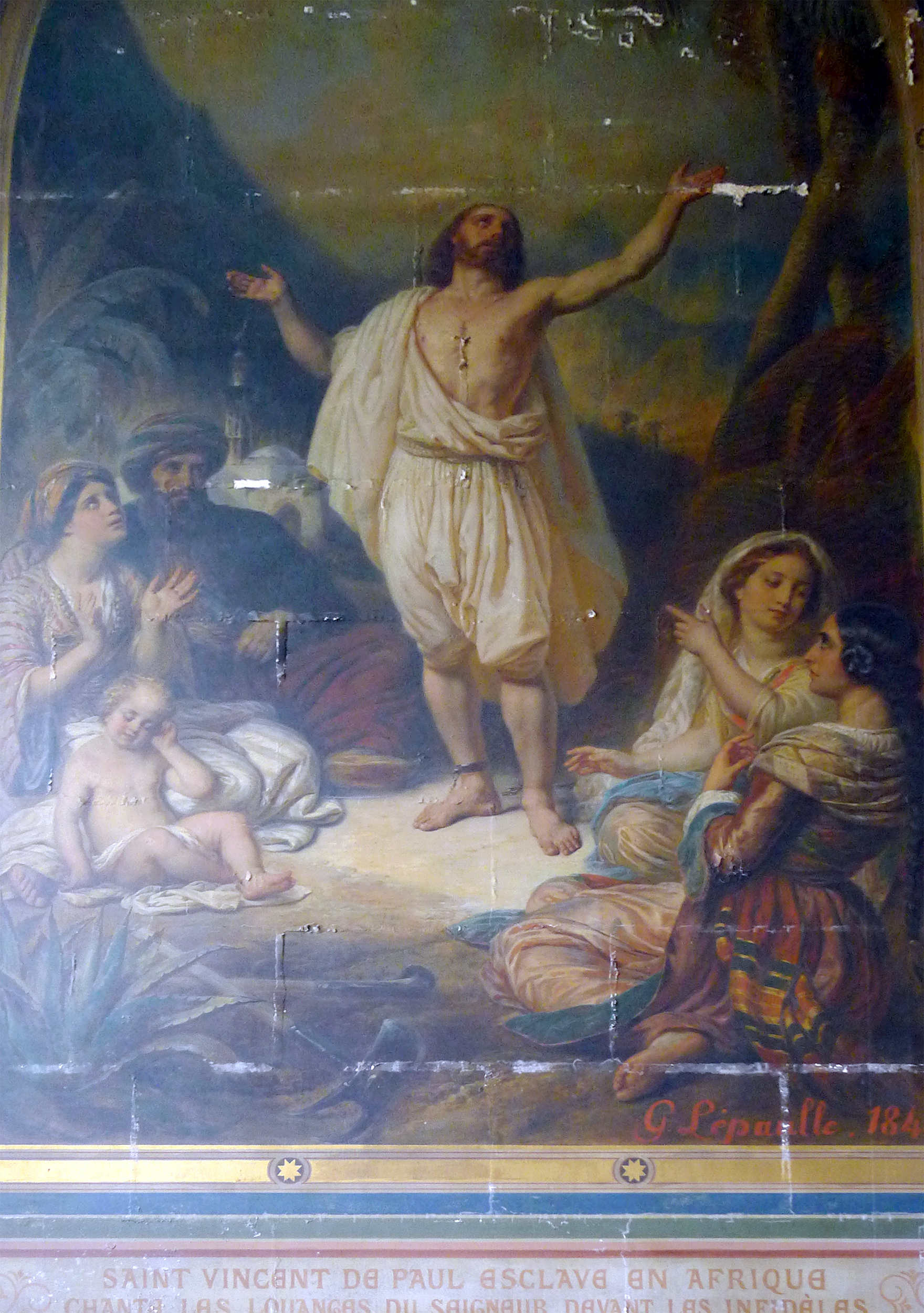
"Samt Vincent de Paul in Africa", fresco by François-Gabriel Lépaulle (1804-1886)

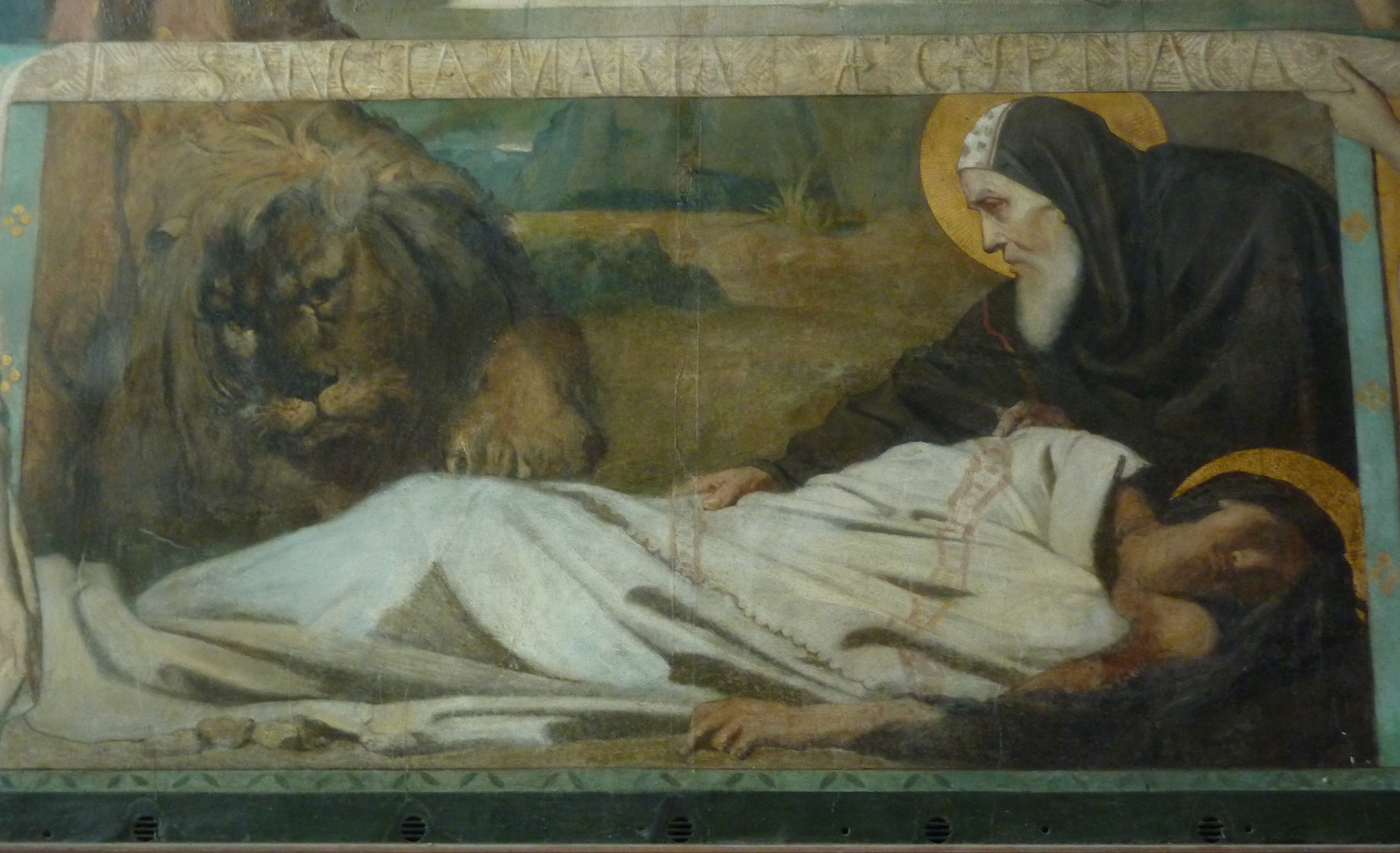
Fresco by Théodore Chassériau (1819-1856) in the third chapel in the northern choir aisle, depiction: Mary the Egyptian is buried by St Zosima, a lion digs her grave

=== The Chapel of the Communion ===
The Chapel of the Communion was built in 1743 by Pierre-Louis Richard, on the plans of Gabriel-Germain Boffrand. It was originally separate from the church, but it was united with the rest of the building in 1760. It occupies three square traverses on the right side of the church. Its lower level symbolises earthy existence, with the sections separated by Corinthian columns, while the decoration of the upper level features three cupolas with windows, represented the vaults of heaven. The centrepiece of the chapel is a large painting, "The Pilgrims of Emmaus" by Charles Coypel (1694-1752). The painting appears like a scene in the theater, blending architecture and art, complete with painted curtains. In the center of the painting is a figure of Christ, bathed in a heavenly light from the painted cupola.

=== The transept ===
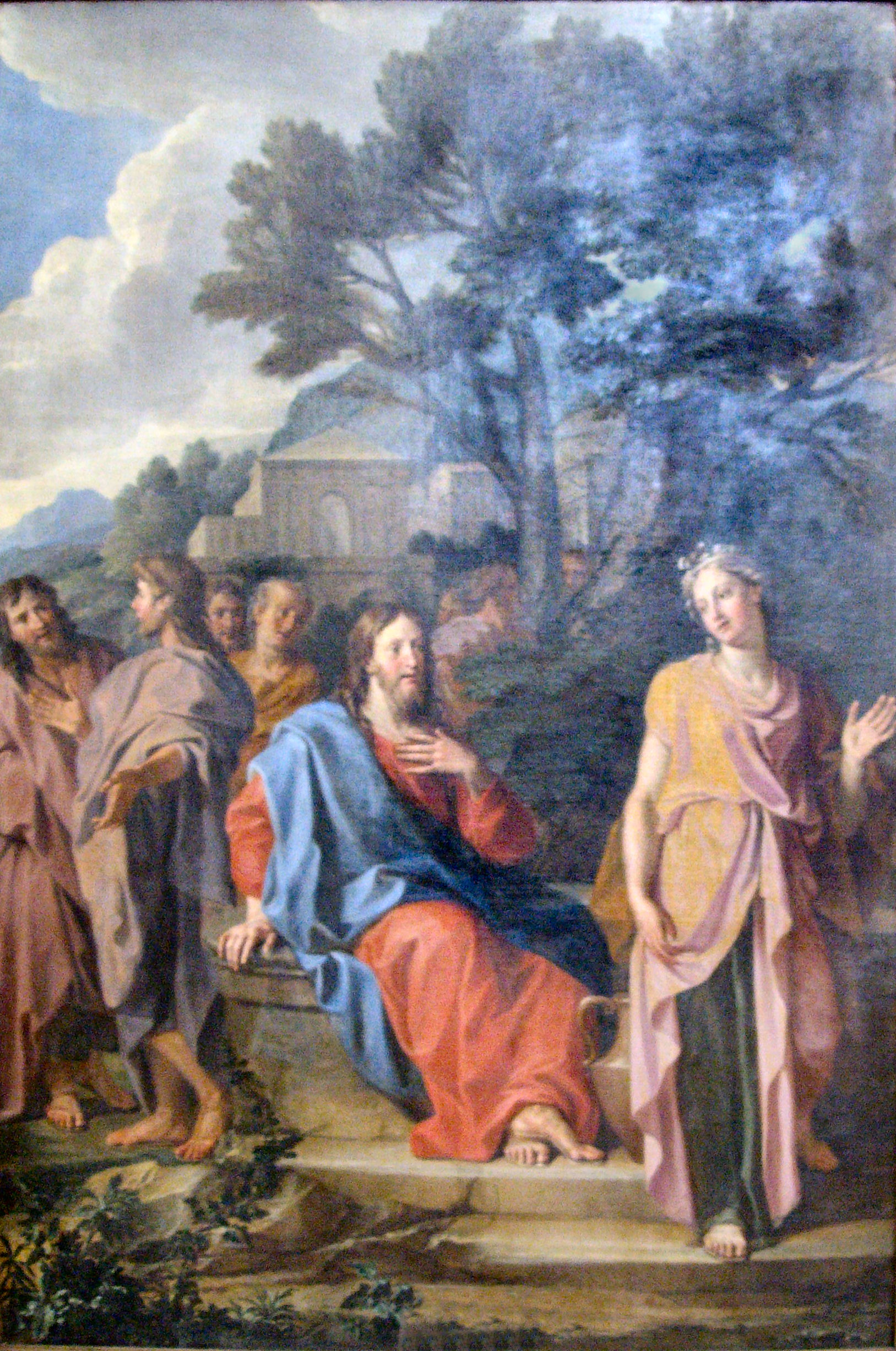
"Jesus and the Samaritan" by Noel Coypel (Transept)

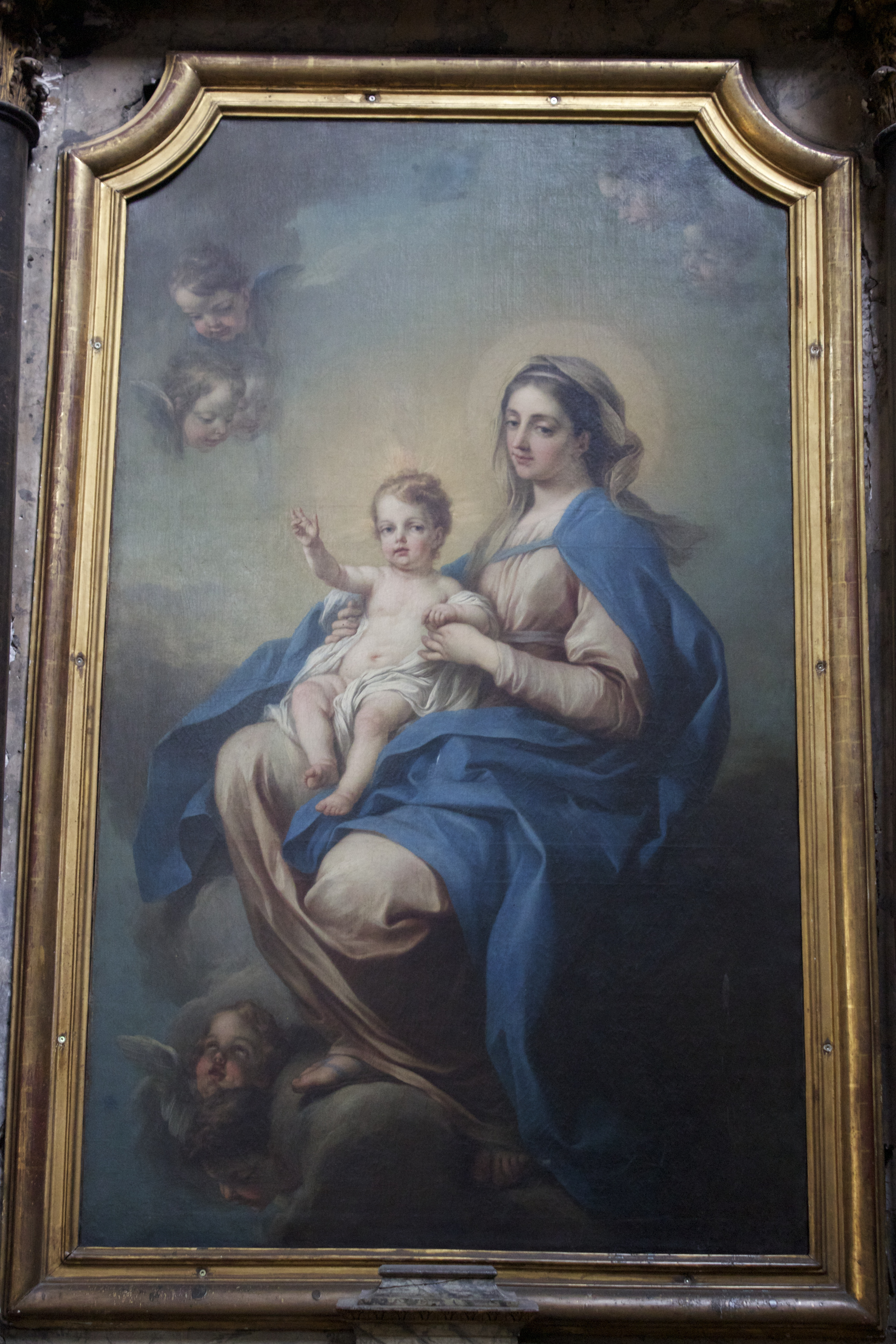
"Virgin and Child" by Charles-André van Loo (1753) (South transept)

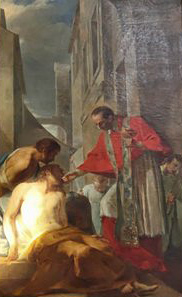
Saint Charles Borromée by GF Colson.

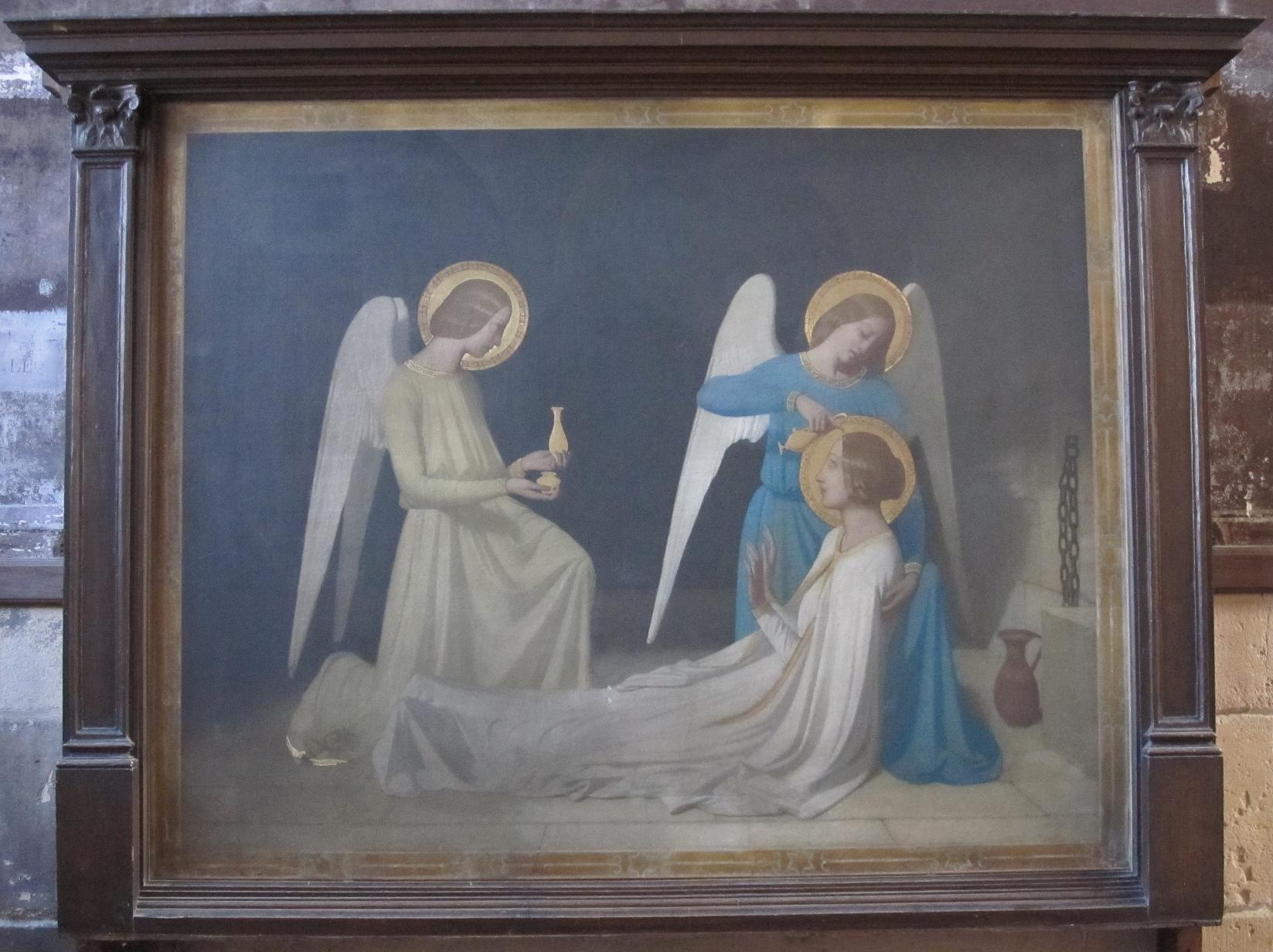
"Saint Philomene" by Eugène Emmanuel Amaury Duval, (1808-1885)

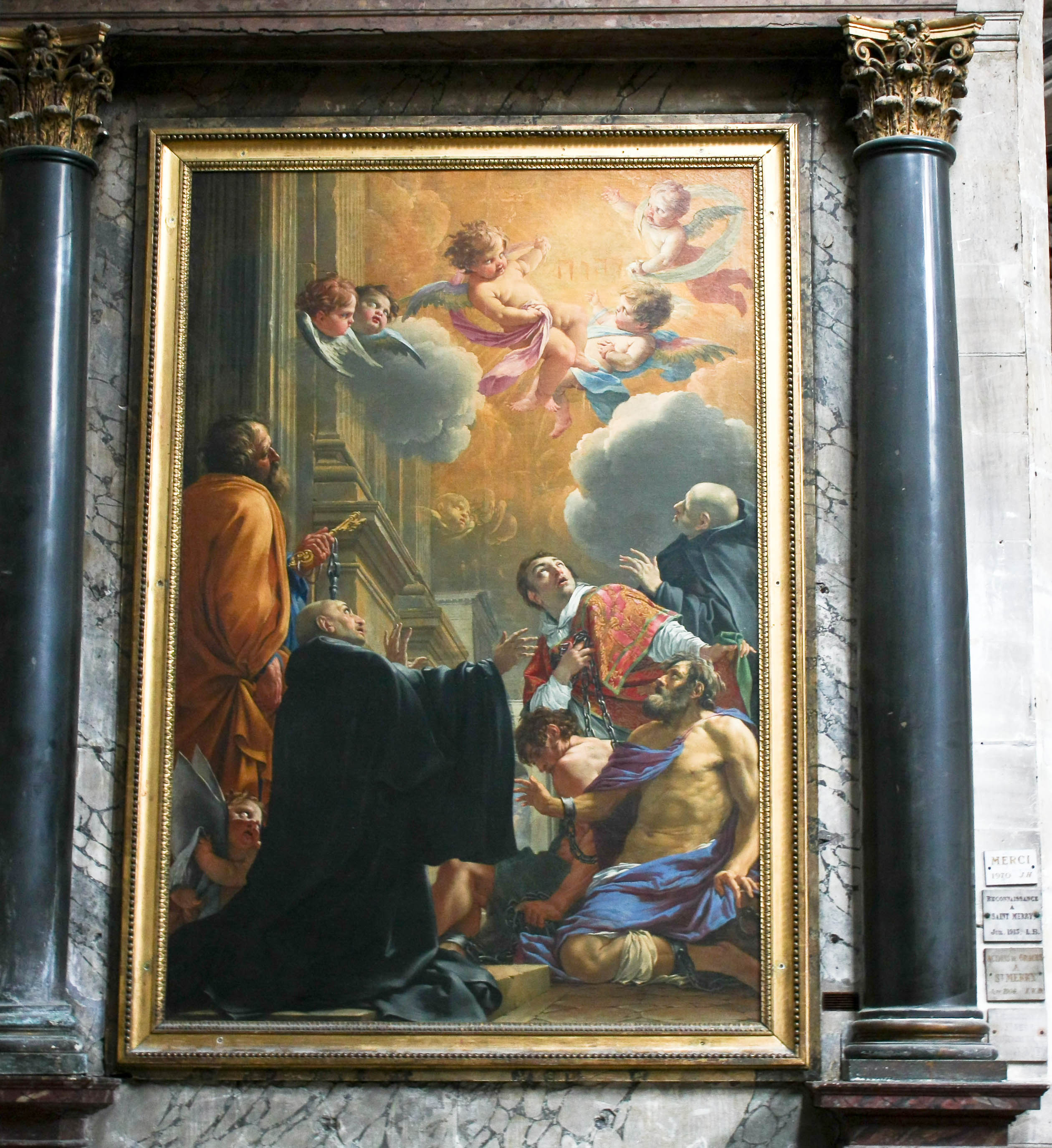
""The Adoration of the Holy Name by the Four Saints", by Simon Vouet (Left Transept)

The transept displays two large paintings in classical frames of New Testament scenes; "Jesus and the Samaritan" by Noel Coypel (1628-1707) and "Saint Peter Repentant" by Joseph-Marie Vien (1716-1809). Within the transept on the left is another major work of 17th century French religious art, "The Adoration of the Holy Name by the Four Saints", a work by Simon Vouet. In this work, a holy light reveals the presence of God, indicated by his name in Hebrew, "Yhwh" ("Jehovah") in the centre of the painting. Saint Peter, Saint Leonard of Noblat and Saint Frou are awed by the light above, and the light dramatically illuminates the black robe of Saint Merri. The

A painting of "Saint Philomene with an Angel" by artist Eugène Emmanuel Amaury-Duval (1808-1885), "Saint Philomene" is found in the transept. He was a pupil of Jean-Auguste-Dominique Ingres, whose style greatly influenced his work.

=== The chapel of Saint-Marie-l'Egyptienne ===
The chapel of Saint Marie the Egyptian in the disambulatory behind the altar contains a fresco by Théodore Chassériau (1819-1856), which was his first major work. He was a pupil of Ingres, and, following Ingres, his work is distinguished by the perfection the features of the figures and the refinement of the colors.

== Stained glass ==
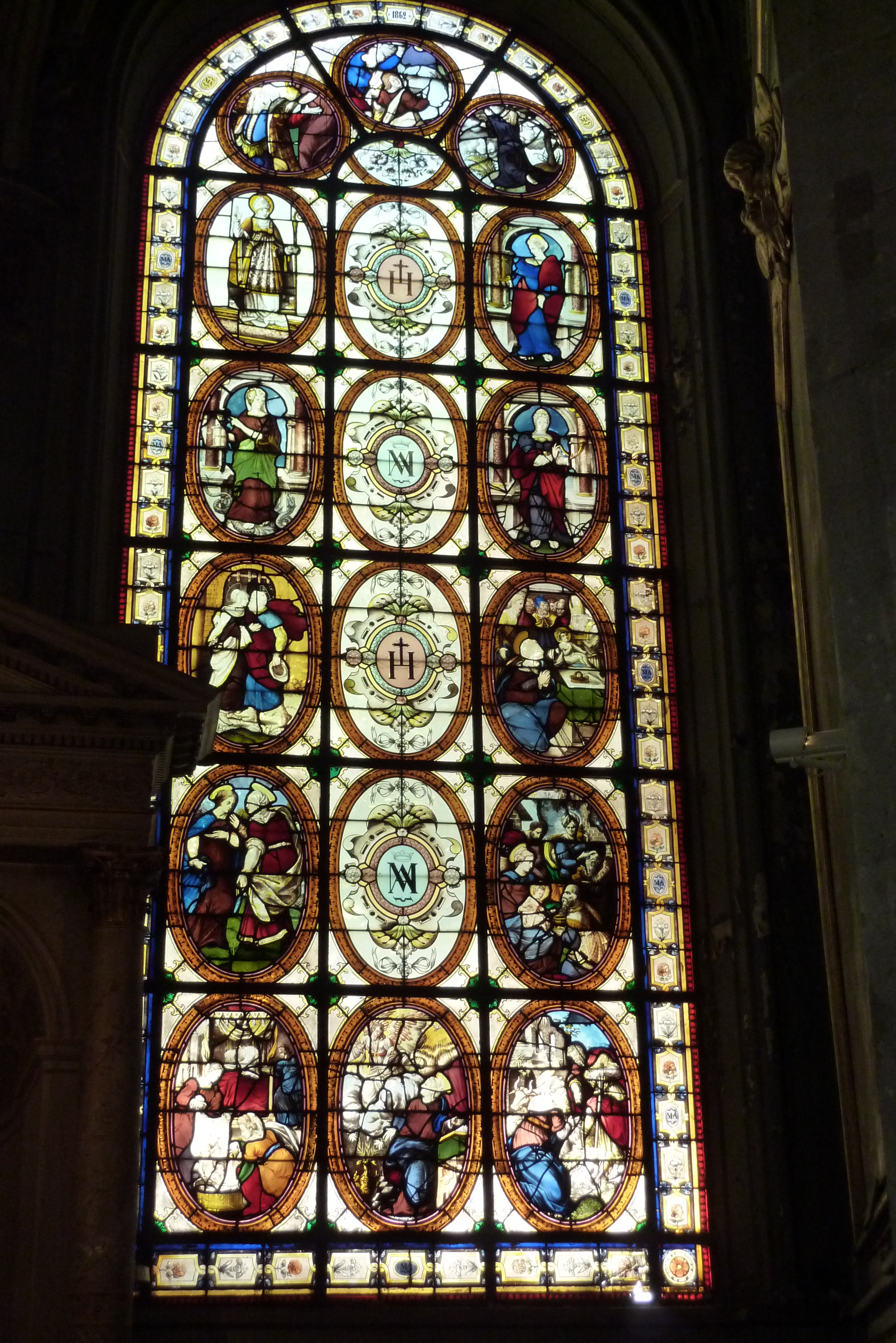
Renaissance window (17th c.) in bay 5 of the choir

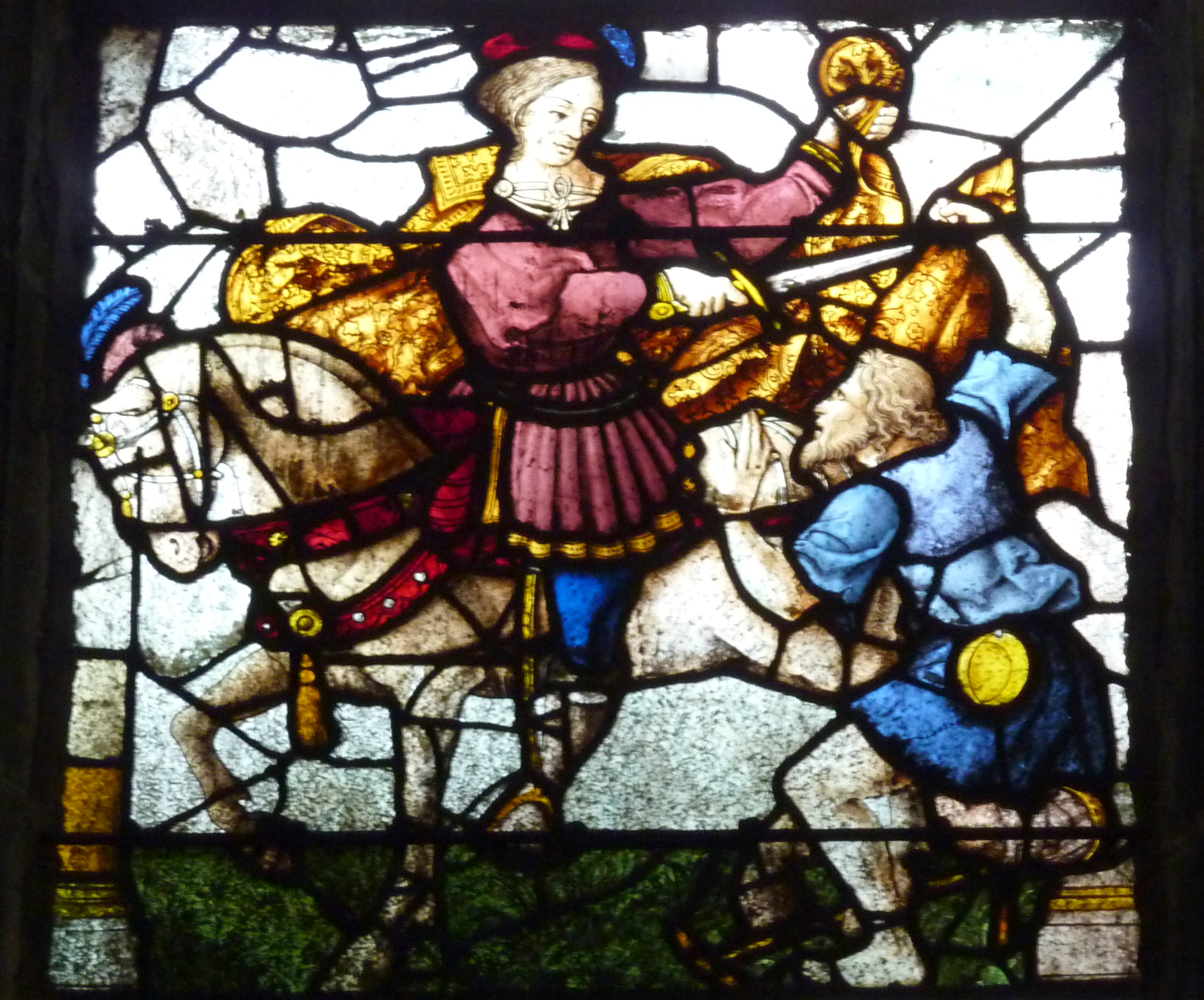
Renaissance window (17th c), bay 5 of the Choir. Saint Martin shares his cloak with a poor man

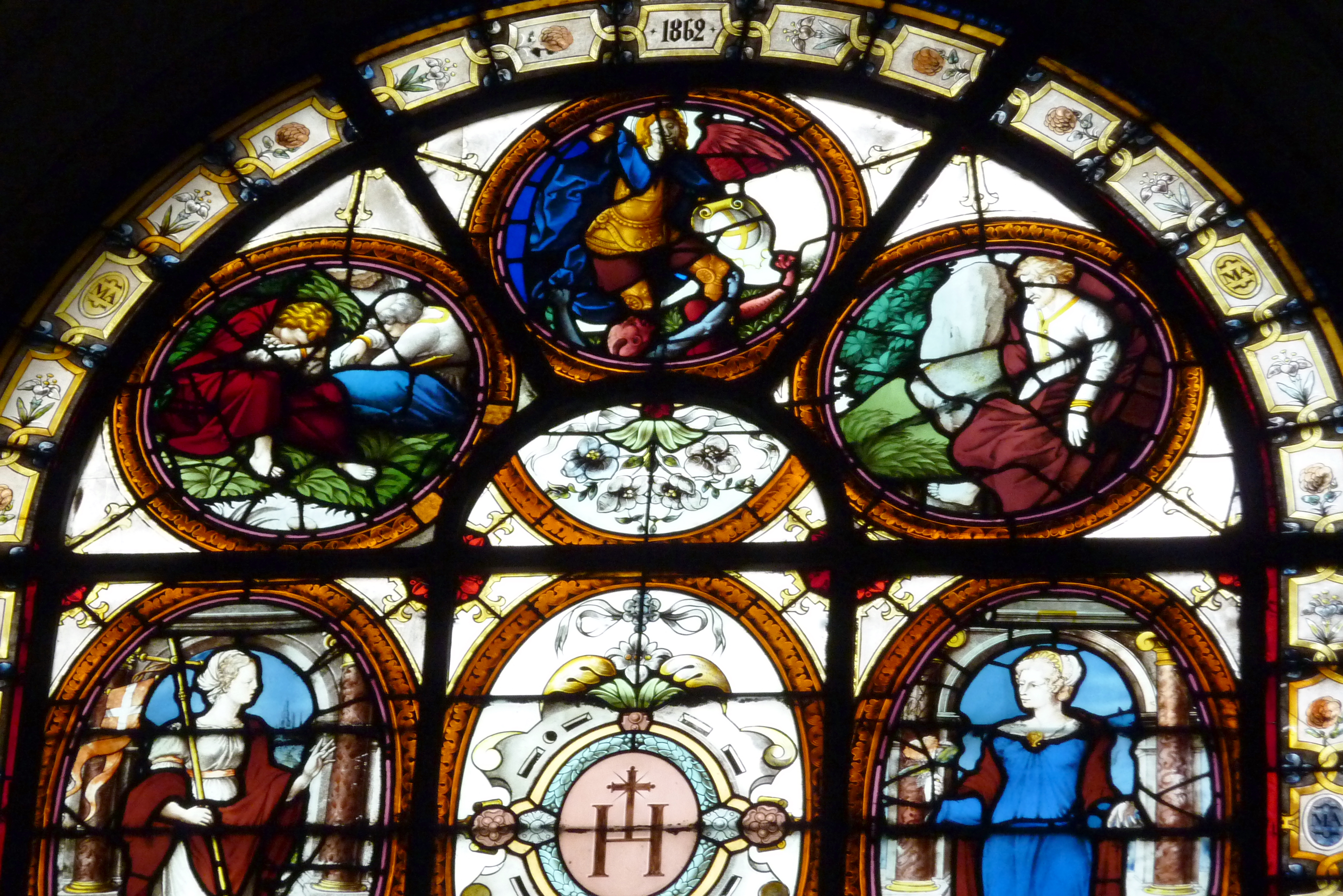
Window in the Chapel of the Virgin (19th century)

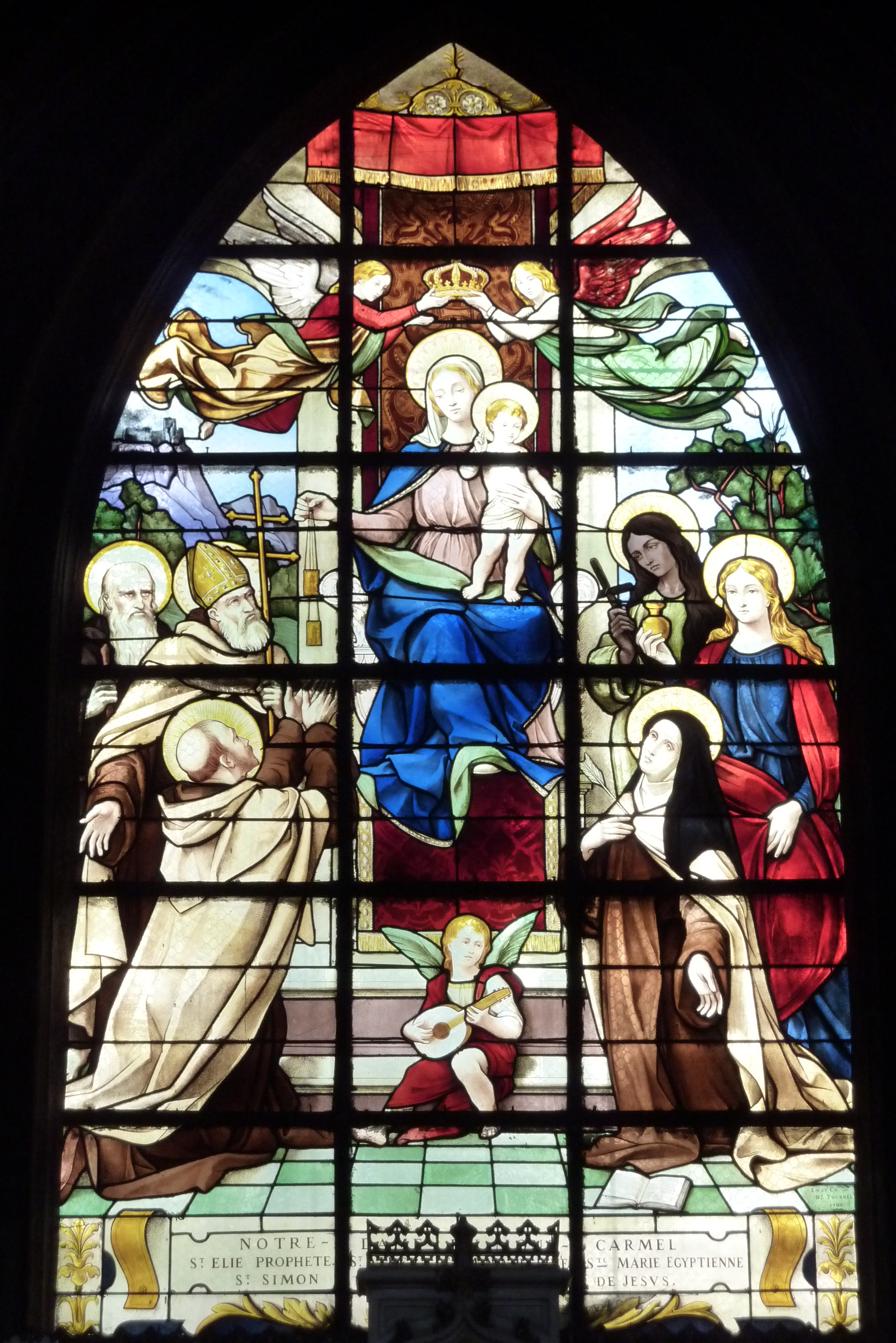
Window of Saint Mary the Egyptian

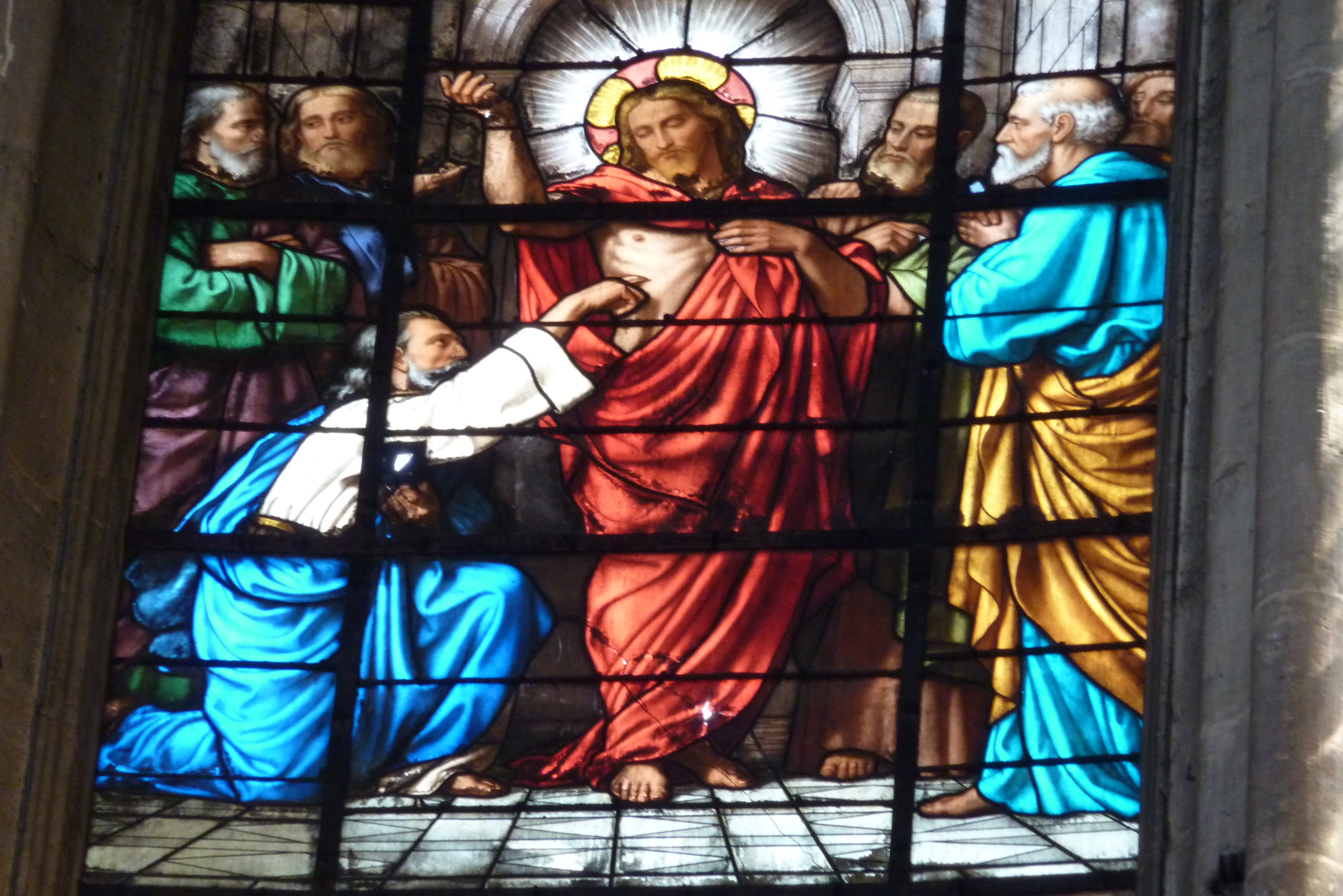
Window depicting the doubts of Saint Thomas, upper window in Chevet (17th c.)

The church has an extensive collection of stained glass from the 17th century and from the 19th century. Much of the early stained glass, especially in the high windows, was removed and replaced with white glass, to bring in more light, and to make it easier for parishioners to see their texts for reading. Most of the windows were created with various techniques using silver stain and other means of painting on the glass with enamel paints, which were then baked, and then sometimes scratched to create shading effects. This allowed more three-dimensional art and greater realism, and brought the art of stained glass closer to paintings than earlier stained glass. However, though they lost some of the mystical qualities of the deeply-colored light coming through the thicker Gothic windows.

Many of the original windows were destroyed during the Revolution, and were replaced in the 19th century with new windows in the Renaissance style, which often used panels from surviving 17th century Renaissance windows. The remade windows frequently have the date of the remake at the top.

== See also ==
- List of historic churches in Paris

== Bibliography (in French) ==
- Brisac, Catherine (1994). Le Vitrail (in French). Paris: La Martinière. ISBN 2-73-242117-0.
- Dumoulin, Aline; Ardisson, Alexandra; Maingard, Jérôme; Antonello, Murielle; Églises de Paris (2010), Éditions Massin, Issy-Les-Moulineaux, ISBN 978-2-7072-0683-1
- Hillairet, Jacques; Connaissance du Vieux Paris; (2017); Éditions Payot-Rivages, Paris; (in French). ISBN 978-2-2289-1911-1
