= Portrait of Franz Liszt =

Painting by Henri Lehmann

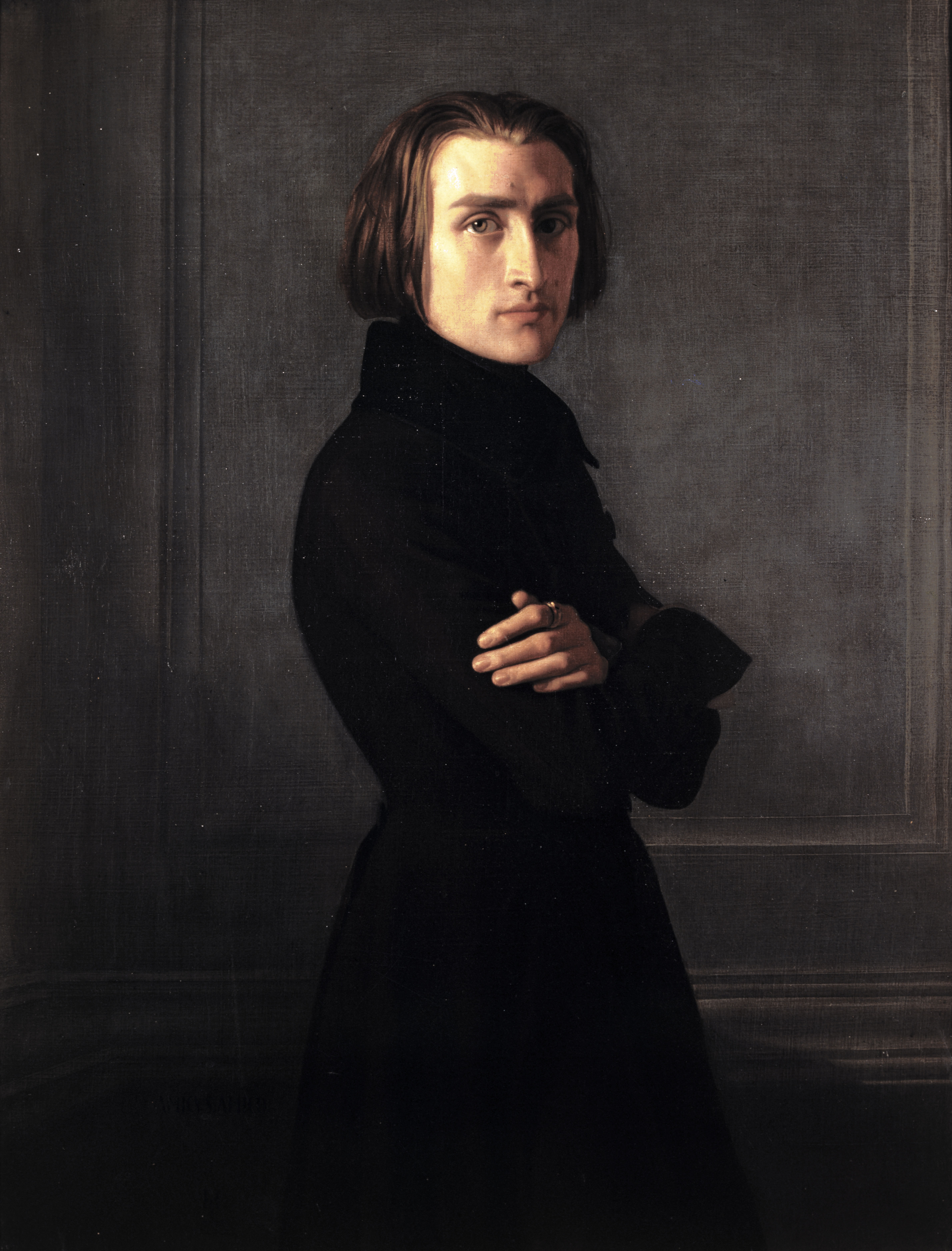
- Artist: Henri Lehmann
- Year: 1839
- Type: Oil on canvas, portrait painting
- Dimensions: 113 cm × 86 cm (44 in × 34 in)
- Location: Musée Carnavalet, Paris

Portrait of Franz Liszt is an 1839 portrait painting by the German-born history painter Henri Lehmann. It depicts the Hungarian composer virtuoso pianist and conductor Franz Liszt, an iconic figure of the Romantic movement. It was produced not long before Lisztomania took hold and his performances drew fanatical fans.

The painting was produced while both men were in Italy. Liszt sat at the Villa Massimiliana in Lucca, but the work was actually completed in Rome. The painting was displayed at the Salon of 1840, held at the Louvre in Paris. It is today in the city's Musée Carnavalet which acquired it in 1942. Lehmann also produced a pendant painting of Liszt's lover Marie d'Agoult.

== See also ==
- Liszt at the Piano, an 1840 painting by Josef Danhauser

== Bibliography ==
- Betzer, Sarah E. Ingres and the Studio; Women, Painting, History. Pennsylvania State University Press, 2012.
- Walker, Alan. Franz Liszt: The Virtuoso Years, 1811-1847. Cornell University Press, 1987.
