= Henri Lehmann =

French painter

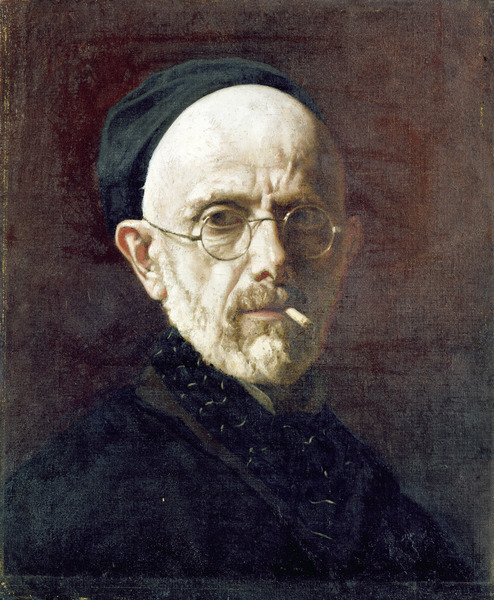
- Self-portrait
- Born: 14 April, 1814; Kiel, Duchy of Holstein
- Died: 30 March, 1882 (aged 67); Paris, France
- Known for: Painting
- Awards: Legion of Honour

Henri Lehmann (French pronunciation: [ɑ̃ʁi ləman]; 14 April 1814 – 30 March 1882) was a German-born French historical painter and portraitist.

== Life ==
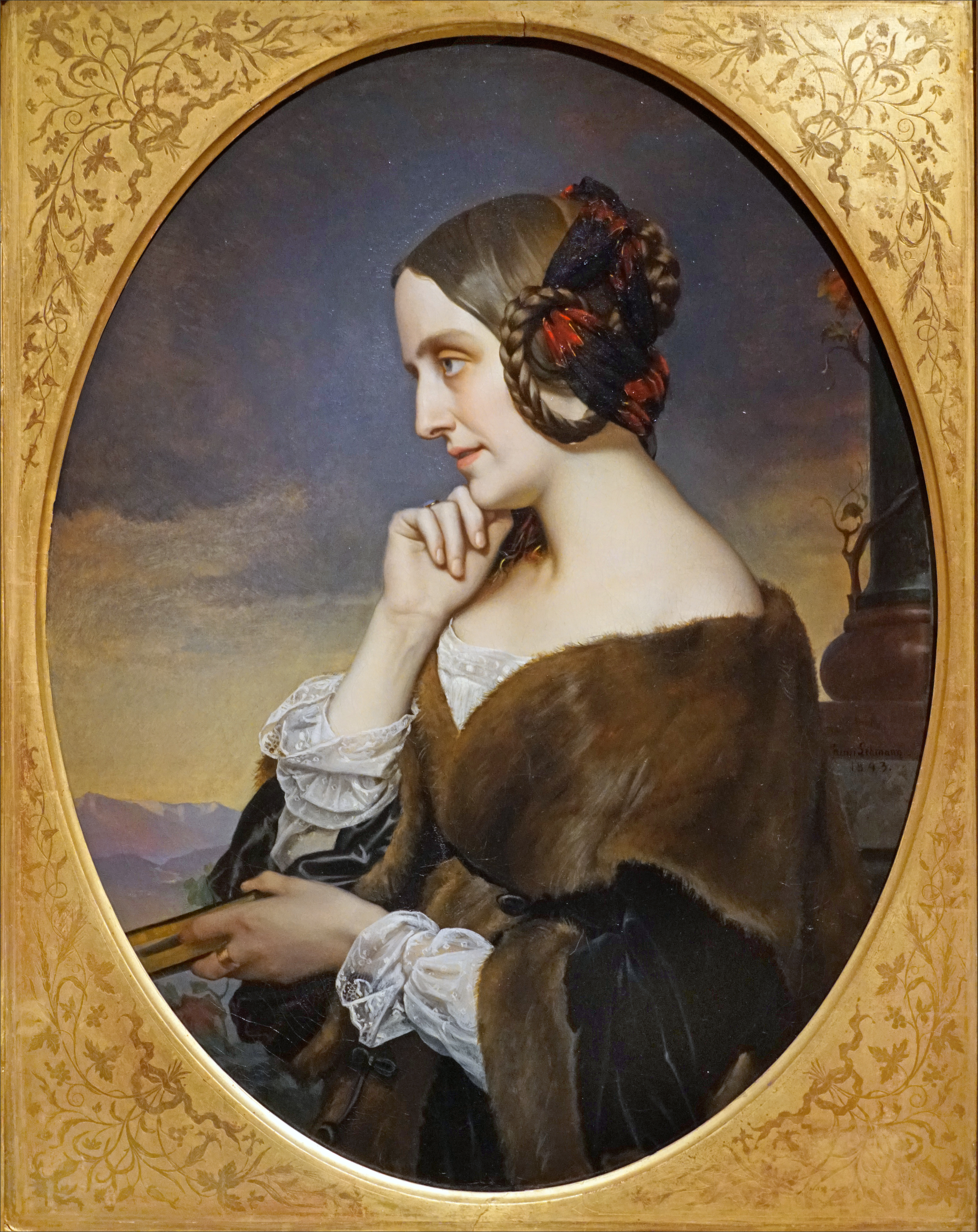
Marie d'Agoult, 1843

Born Heinrich Salem Lehmann in Kiel, in the Duchy of Holstein, he received his first art tuition from his father Leo Lehmann (1782–1859) and from other painters in Hamburg. In 1831, at the age of 17, he travelled to Paris to study art under Jean Auguste Dominique Ingres, becoming one of his most accomplished pupils and a close associate for many years. His first exhibition was at the Salon of 1835 where he won a second-class medal. Thereafter he exhibited regularly at the Salon, winning first-class medals in 1840, 1848 and 1855.

Lehmann lived in Rome from 1838 until 1841, where he continued his artistic education with Ingres (who was by then Director of the Académie de France there), and collaborated with him on some works—including Ingres' painting Luigi Cherubini and the Muse of Lyric Poetry. In Rome Lehmann befriended Franz Liszt and his lover, the author Marie d'Agoult, corresponding with them for many years and painting portraits of them.

Lehmann settled permanently in Paris in 1842. He was awarded many commissions for large-scale public works, such as at the Hôtel de Ville, the Church of Ste-Clothilde, the Palais du Luxembourg, the Palais de Justice, and the Chapel of the Jeunes Aveugles in the Church of Saint-Merri on Rue Saint-Martin.

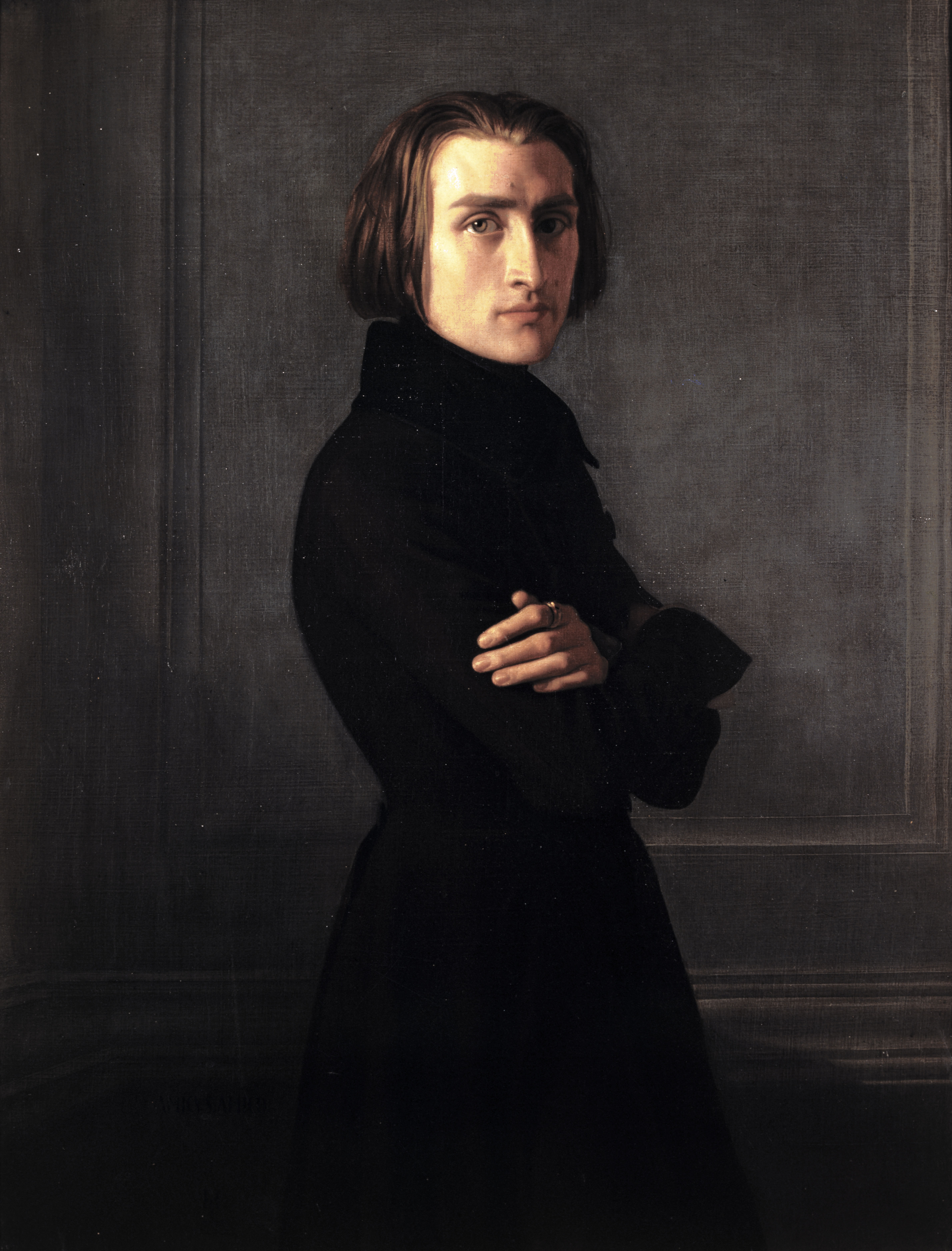
Portrait of Franz Liszt, c. 1839

In 1846 Lehmann received the Légion d'honneur and in 1847 became a French citizen, opening his studio in that same year. In 1861 he became a teacher at the famous École des Beaux-Arts and was appointed Professor in 1875. He founded the Lehmann Prize to recognise academic excellence in art. In 1864 he was elected a member of the Institut de France.

He died in Paris in 1882. His brother Rudolf Lehmann was also a well-known portrait artist.

== Pupils of Lehmann ==
- Edmond Aman-Jean
- Édouard Joseph Dantan
- Julien Dupré
- Amédée Forestier
- Alphonse Osbert
- Camille Pissarro
- Alexandre Séon
- Georges Seurat
- Modesto Brocos

== Work ==
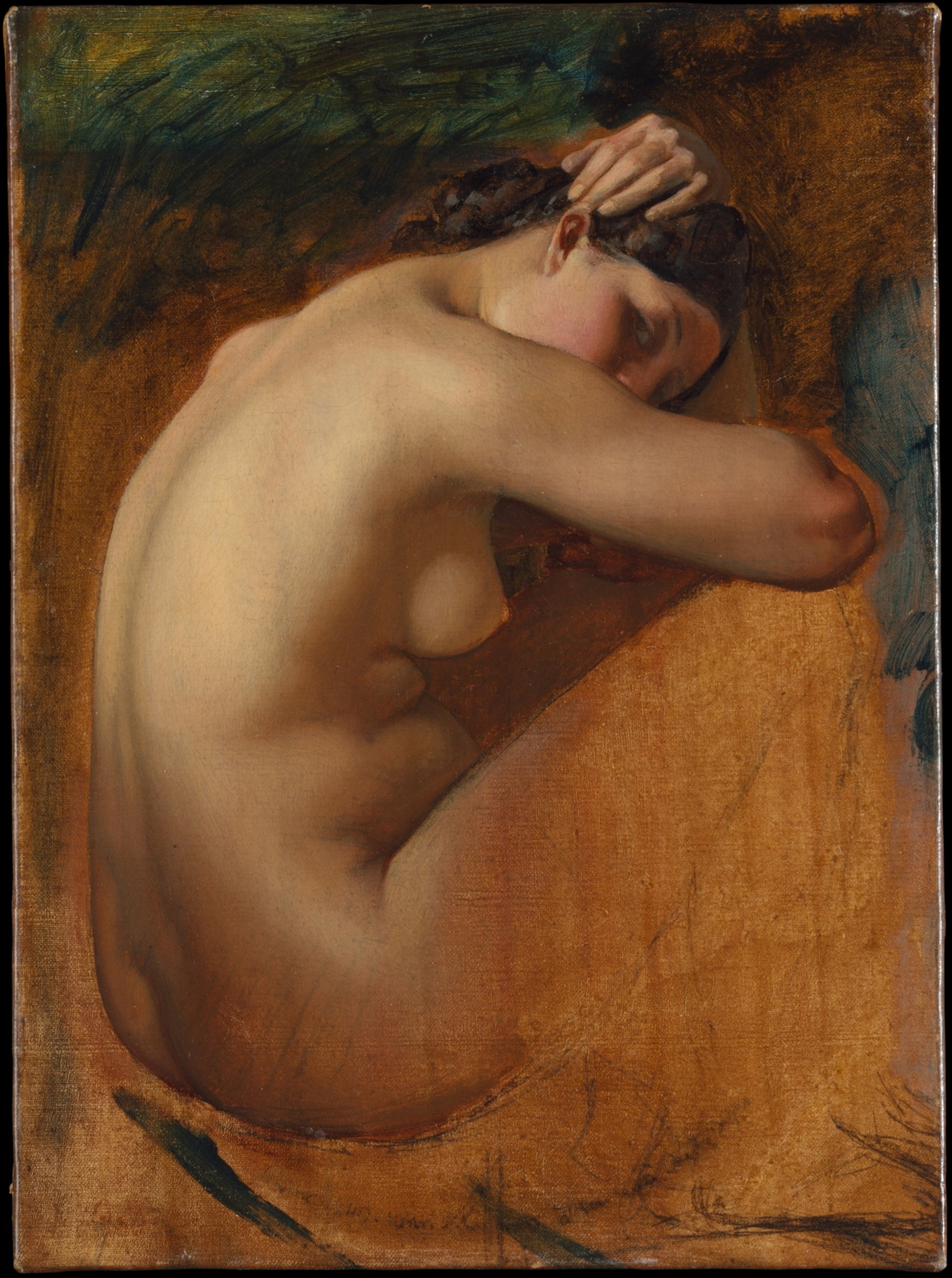
Study of a Female Nude, The Metropolitan Museum

Lehmann was a painter of portraits and religious, genre, historical, allegorical and literary works. He drew inspiration from classical mythology, Shakespeare, Goethe, and contemporary writers. Sometimes considered dry and academic, the best of his work can be both pure in line and graceful in form. Among the best of his canvases are:

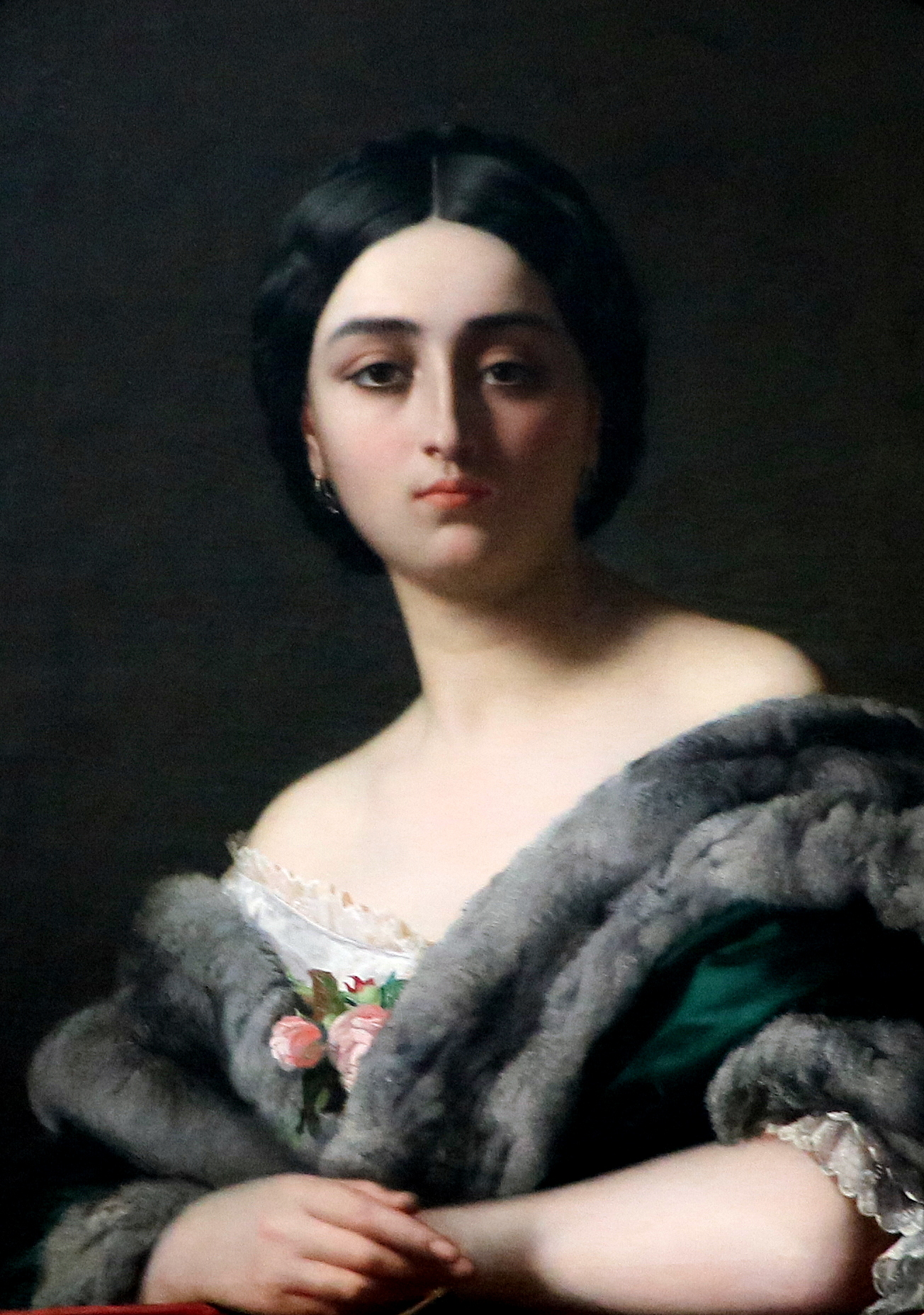
Portrait of Léonide (ou Monna Belcolore), 1848, Musée d’arts de Nantes

- Jephtha's Daughter (1836)
- Grief of the Oceanides (1850)
- Prometheus
- Erigone's Dream
- Venus Anadyomene
- Adoration of Magi and Shepherds (1855, Rheims Museum)
- Marriage of Tobias (1866)

Mural paintings include those in the chapels of the church of St. Merry, on the ceiling of the Great Hall in the Palais de Justice, and in the Throne Hall, Luxembourg Palace.

He painted numerous portraits of celebrated contemporaries, including Edmond About, Marie d'Agoult, Princess Christina Belgiojoso, Chopin, Victor Cousin, Charles Gounod, Ingres, Liszt, and Stendhal. He painted a portrait of himself for the Uffizi Gallery, Florence.
