= Grazers (Christianity) =

Category of hermits and anchorites

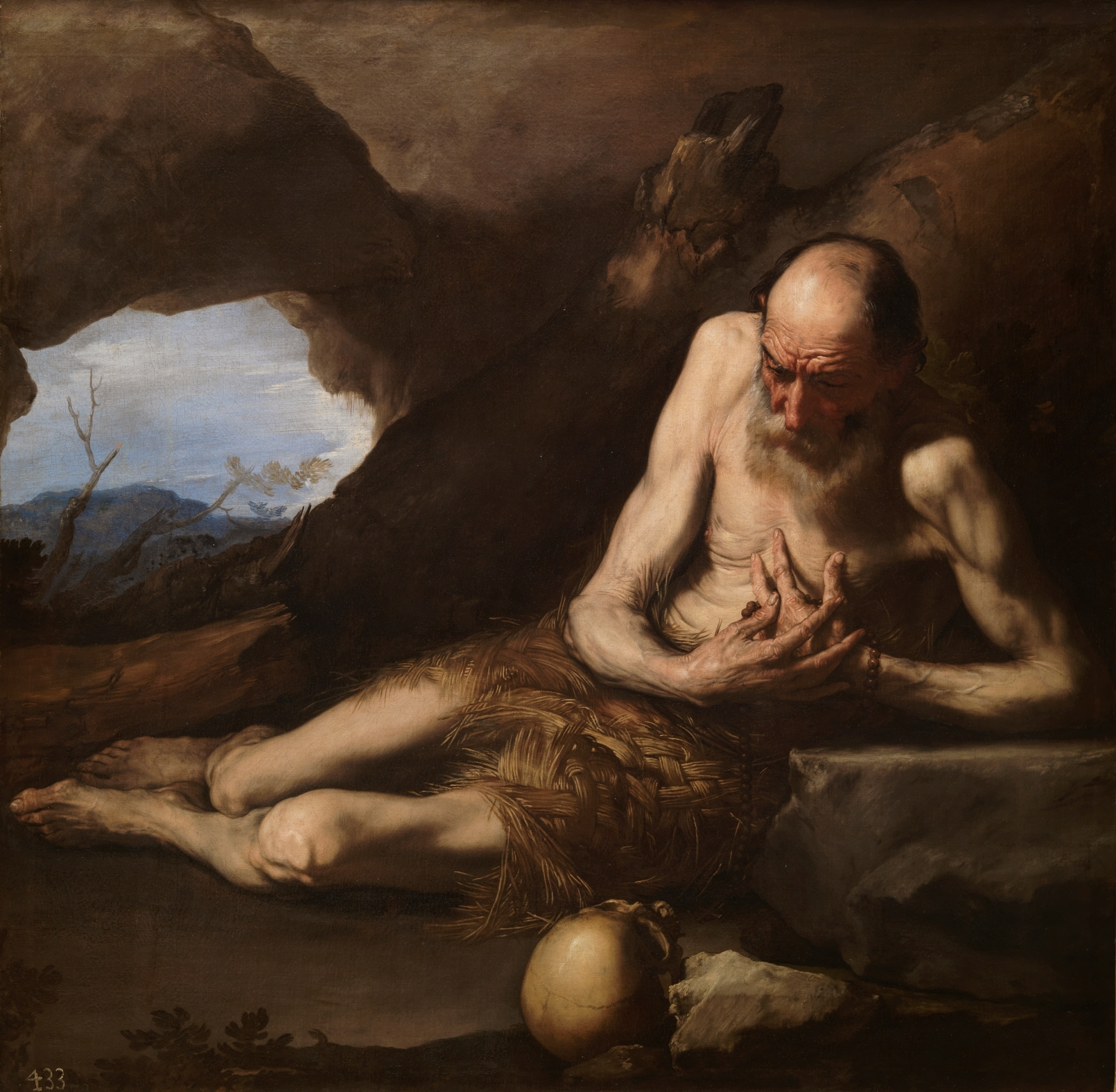
Saint Paul, "The First Hermit", Jusepe de Ribera, Museo del Prado (1640)

The grazers or boskoi (in Ancient Greek: βοσκοί, romanized: boskoí) were male and female Christian hermits and anchorites who lived in the first millennium of the Christian era, mainly in the Christian East, in Syria, Palestine, Pontus, Mesopotamia, and Egypt.

They derived their name from their practices, which consisted of nourishing themselves only with raw plants, often on all fours, and living in a wild manner, "among the beasts." They were dressed in clothes made exclusively from leaves and vegetation, or simply completely naked. Furthermore, they did not cultivate plants and did not use fire. They were linked to another type of hermits called the "dendrites", which seemed to have the same way of living but in trees.

The grazers may perhaps be among the inspirations for the wild man archetype, a legendary figure in medieval Europe.

== Etymology ==
Their name comes from the Greek verb βόσκω, romanized as boskô, which means "to pasture, graze." The ambivalence of the term, which signifies both "those who pasture" and "those who graze," is the same in the corresponding Syriac term.

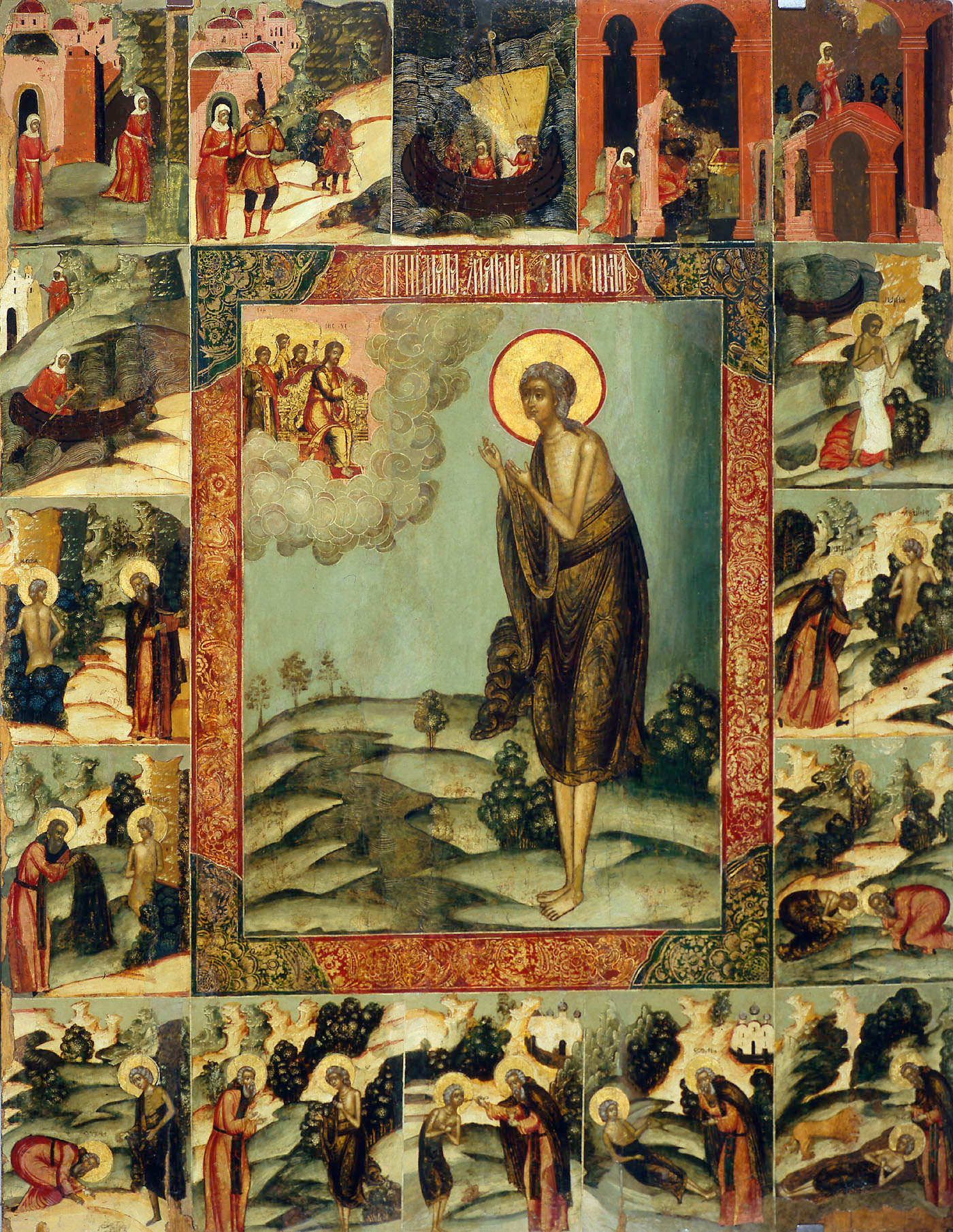
Russian-style icon of Saint Mary of Egypt, surrounded by scenes from her life (17th century, Beliy Gorod).

== Theological foundations ==
The grazers seemed to base themselves on various biblical verses to embark on this particular eremitic life. First and foremost, they aimed to resemble John the Baptist, whom the New Testament, especially the Gospel of Matthew, presents in the following manner:

John’s clothes were made of camel’s hair, and he had a leather belt around his waist. His food was locusts and wild honey.

The figure of David was also invoked through the Psalms, and some of them quoted Psalm 102 from the Septuagint. Thus, this psalm was invoked in the epitaph of Paul of Thebes, one of the most famous grazers, who declared:

Our days, mortals, are like the grass of the fields," says the prophet David. Therefore, it is fitting that we eat grass and wear clothes made of it throughout our lives.

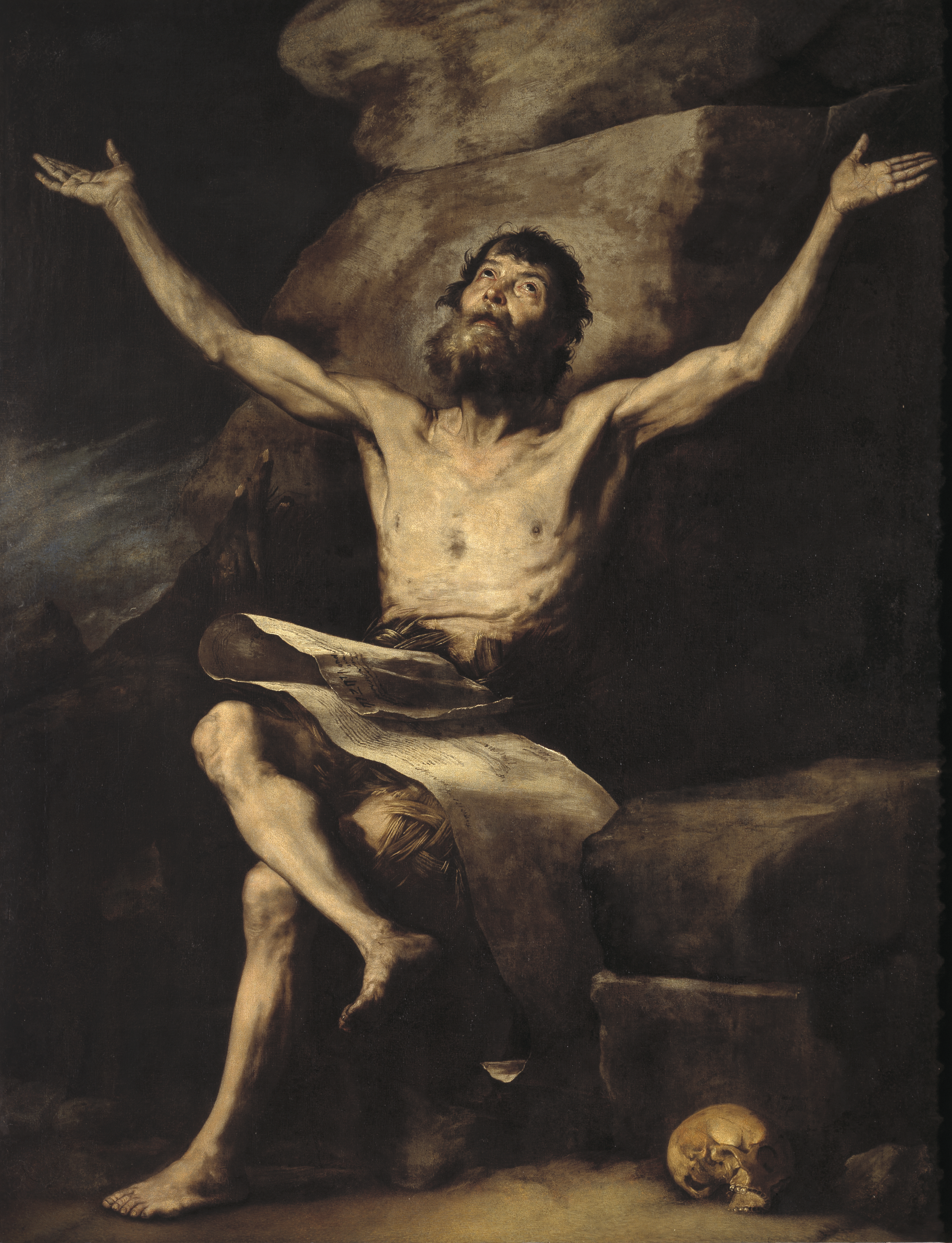
Paul the Hermit, by Jusepe de Ribera (1644)

More generally, for the grazers, it was about returning to the Adamic state, meaning the condition of Adam and Eve before the Fall of mankind, where humanity would have been vegetarian, naked, and living among the animals. This led Christian authors to generally consider that wild animals lived in peace with the grazers because they would have lived Adam's life on earth. A passage from Genesis could have encouraged them to embrace nudity:

And the two were naked, both Adam and his wife, and were not ashamed.

However, some researchers believe that the nudity of the grazers is not so much connected to the Adamic state, but is more linked to a general rejection of society and its moral norms. For them, it would specifically be a rejection of the urbanization of the Christian world around the turn of the 4th century. Among the theological foundations underlying this lifestyle choice, one also finds the anticipation of the end of the world and the hope for the salvation of humanity, two significant ideas in Christianity.

== History ==
=== Written sources ===
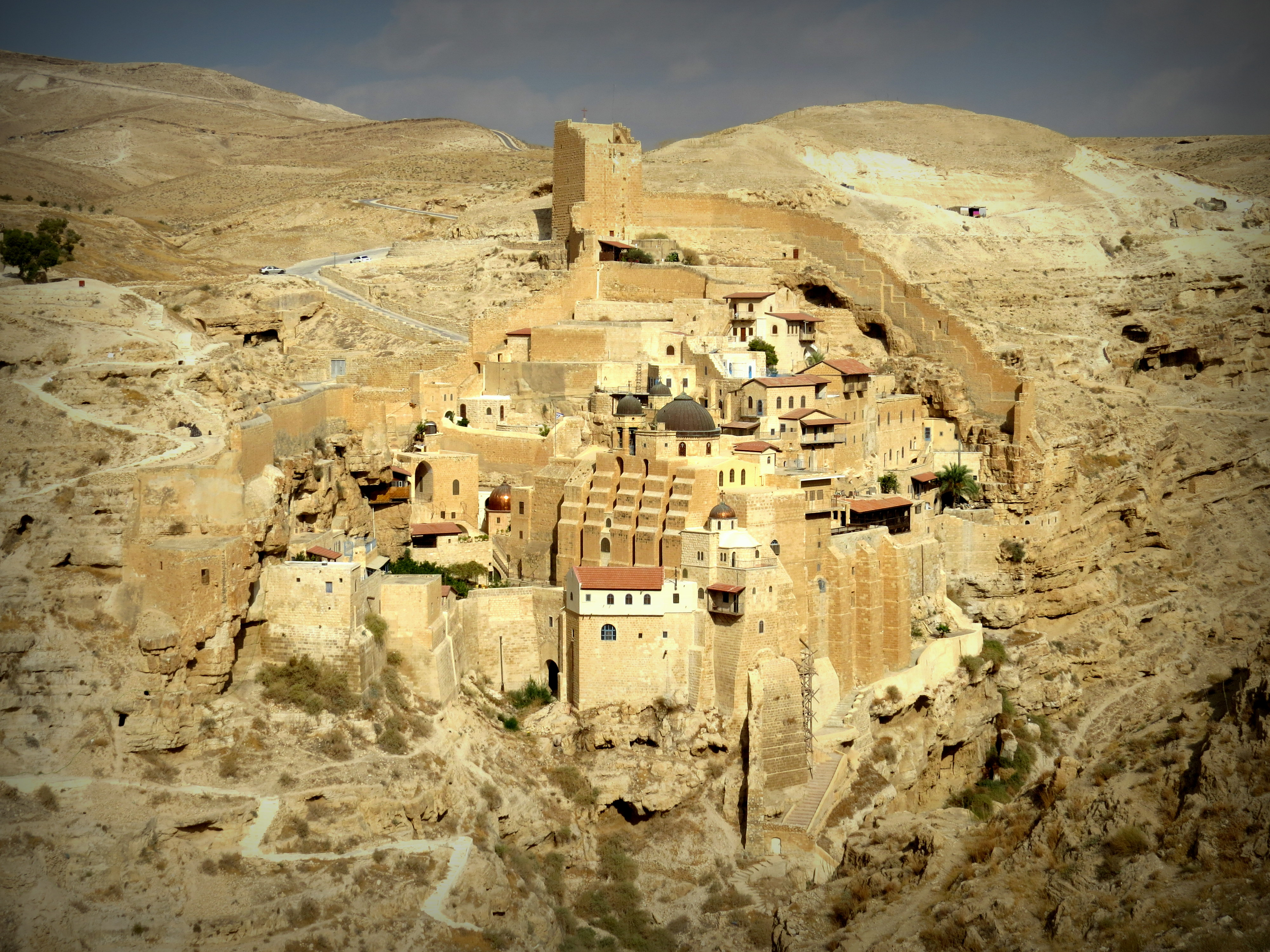
Mar Saba monastery, founded by the disciples of Sabbas the Sanctified, a Palestinian grazer hermit and monk

It appears that although the practice can be found in various Eastern regions such as Syria, Palestine, Pontus, Mesopotamia, and Egypt, the grazers were most numerous in Palestine and Syria. There are numerous attestations of them in Christian literature; for instance, John Moschus dedicated a work called the Spiritual Meadow to Palestinian monks, where he mentioned many grazers, a total of fifteen, indicating that the practice was common in the region. John Moschus mentioned the practice more times than all other occurrences in Greek literature combined, suggesting that dedicating oneself to this lifestyle was quite popular in his time. They are also cited by Sozomen, Evagrius Scholasticus, Theodoret, Ephrem the Syrian, and the Sayings of the Desert Fathers.

In a passage from John Moschus, a female grazer encountered a male grazer, declaring that she led the same life as him, a text interpreted as evidence that the practice was not exclusively male. Sozomen described them as follows:

When they begin this philosophy, they are called the boskoi [grazers], for they have no houses, eat neither bread nor meat, and do not drink wine, but constantly live in the mountains, continually praising God through prayers and hymns according to the laws of the Church. At the usual meal hours, each takes a sickle and roams the mountains, feeding on wild plants as if grazing. This is their form of philosophy.

The historian Evagrius Scholasticus, on his part, stated:

Others have invented a different way of life, seemingly beyond the strength and endurance of ordinary humans. They have chosen a desert exposed to the scorching Sun to dwell in, and there are men and women who, having entered it almost naked, endure throughout all seasons, be it the intensity of cold or the excess of heat. They disdain the foods used by other humans and content themselves with grazing like animals. They have many peculiar behaviors. For as soon as they see a person, they flee, and if someone pursues them, they escape with incredible speed and hide in inaccessible places.

In the Life of Symeon the Holy Fool, a Byzantine hagiographical text, Symeon's companion, John, questioned him about what they would eat. Symeon responded that they will eat what the grazers eat. It is also said that Sabbas the Sanctified was a grazer, gathering other grazers to establish his community and likely consuming plants like Asphodelus aestivus and carob. Among the Byzantine saints adopting this lifestyle, Cyril of Scythopolis mentioned a certain John the Cilician, who supposedly lived for seventy years consuming only grass and dates, as well as John of Lycopolis and James of Nisibis.

Contemporary Christians of these eremitic practices regarded them with significant reverence and generally viewed them favorably. These practices were seen as holy by Byzantine society, even though ecclesiastical authorities might have viewed this extreme form of eremitism with suspicion in some cases. In connection with the reverence they received, Macarius of Egypt stated regarding them that he, still clothed and not naked, "had not yet become a monk".

=== Archeological sources ===
It is difficult to find archaeological evidence of the grazers, primarily because they led a frugal life without fire, tools, and minimal reliance on architecture. They were nomadic, and it often proves challenging to distinguish between the traces left by grazer communities and those left by other monastic communities. However, some archaeological discoveries, particularly in the Palestinian desert, could likely be connected to the grazers. For instance, isolated jars were discovered alone in certain caves, presumably used for water storage. In terms of architecture, complexes of inhabited caves, such as those found at 'Ein er-Rashah, served as precursors to lauras, and isolated chapels were constructed above or around caves.

== Diverse yet similar practices ==
Depending on the location in which they lived, the grazers adopted slightly different lifestyles. Some of them wore clothing made of leaves and vegetation, primarily from flax, along with a cord around their waist. Others lived completely naked. Most of them grazed on grass directly from the ground, on all fours. However, those living in Egypt fed on aquatic plants in the mud of the Nile. They inhabited both plains and mountains, even caves.

It is assumed that one of the main sources of sustenance for those practicing this life was consuming plants of Asphodelus aestivus and saltbushes; rarely they could also eat bread brought to them by visitors. They would drink water by, for example, collecting it from the cavities in rocks that retained rainwater.

All of them rejected the use of fire to cook food, considering it a consequence of the Fall. Nevertheless, some still cooked food by placing it on stones to be exposed to the sun. They also fed on wild berries. Additionally, it is possible that some of them consumed locusts, based on a passage from Leviticus permitting their consumption, and because they venerated John the Baptist, who, according to the Gospel, is said to have fed on "locusts and honey". Most of them lived alone or in small groups, and they all seemed to move at different times of the year due to not cultivating food, leading to a nomadic lifestyle. Despite their wild existence, it appears that they had regular meal times, following biblical patterns of eating at specific hours.

Other hermits with similar lifestyles lived directly in trees and are referred to as 'dendrites', literally meaning 'the arboreals'.

== Legacy ==
It is possible that grazers served as inspiration for, or gave rise to, certain legends related to the wild man archetype, which later developed in Europe.

The figure of the grazer has served as inspiration for many literary characters. It was used by François Weyergans in his work Macaire le Copte.

== See also ==
- Gymnosophists
