= All This and World War II =

1976 film by Susan Winslow

- Theatrical release poster
- Directed by: Susan Winslow
- Produced by: Sanford Lieberson; Martin J. Machat
- Cinematography: Anthony Richmond
- Edited by: Colin J. Berwick
- Music by: John Lennon; Paul McCartney
- Production company: Visual Programme Systems Ltd.
- Distributed by: 20th Century Fox
- Release dates: 11 November 1976 (Cinerama Dome); 12 November 1976 (United States)
- Running time: 88 minutes
- Countries: United Kingdom; United States
- Language: English
- Budget: $650,000

All This and World War II is a 1976 musical documentary film directed by Susan Winslow.

== Synopsis ==
The film juxtaposes Beatles songs covered by a variety of musicians with archival World War II newsreel footage and excerpts from 20th Century Fox films made during the era.

== Cast ==
The film features clips from contemporary newsreels. Scenes from Four Jills in a Jeep, Guadalcanal Diary, The Longest Day, Tora! Tora! Tora!, Patton, A Bell for Adano, Great Guns, and other 20th Century Fox war films are also used. A scene from Casablanca, a Warner Bros. Pictures film, was used.

Footage of Edgar Bergen and Charlie McCarthy, Humphrey Bogart, Neville Chamberlain, Winston Churchill, Dwight D. Eisenhower, Clark Gable, Laurel and Hardy, Adolf Hitler, Bob Hope, Charles Lindbergh, Douglas MacArthur, Benito Mussolini, Eleanor Roosevelt, Franklin D. Roosevelt, Joseph Stalin, and James Stewart is used in the film.

== Production ==
Russ Regan came up with the film after having dreams of Hitler in Berchtesgaden set to "The Fool on the Hill", the Liberation of Paris set to "Michelle", and the attack on Pearl Harbor set to "Here Comes the Sun".

Lou Reizner was the musical director of Sgt. Pepper's Lonely Hearts Club Band, but left the project while retaining the rights to three performances by the Bee Gees. Reizner made the soundtrack for All This and World War II with Wil Malone. The backing sound was provided by the London Symphony Orchestra. Frankie Laine stated that he covered "Maxwell's Silver Hammer" solely because Reizner was his friend and that there was "not much else to say".

Sanford Lieberson asked Terry Gilliam to direct the film, but Gilliam declined the offer. Susan Winslow, a 24-year old researcher for the film, was promoted to director due to her selection of footage; it was the only film she directed. Colin J. Berwick edited the film. It took three years to produce the film and researchers went through one million feet of film. The budget was around $650,000.

== Release ==
All This and World War II was distributed by 20th Century Fox and given a PG rating by the Motion Picture Association of America. It premiered at the Cinerama Dome, in Los Angeles on November 11, 1976. It was shown out-of-competition at the 1977 Cannes Film Festival.

It was rumored that Fox had all of the prints of the film destroyed. The film has never been officially released on home video. In 2016, Tony Palmer re-edited the film, inserted different archival footage, and used different music to make The Beatles and WWII.

== Reception ==
All This and World War II received mostly negative reviews from critics and was withdrawn from theaters by 20th Century Fox. It was a financial failure at the box office.

New York Daily News wrote that the film's PG rating must have stood for "Positively Ghastly". It has since occasionally been shown at film festivals and on cable TV in the US.

Kevin Thomas, writing for the Los Angeles Times, described the film as tasteless and offensive. Ruth Batchelor, writing for the Los Angeles Free Press, criticized the musical selection, stated that the overall film was tacky, and that those over 40 would resent the film while those under 30 would not understand it. Joe Baltake described it as a "pointless documentary" in his review for the Philadelphia Daily News. The editing was compared to that of a 6th grade history book by Jerry Stein's review in The Cincinnati Post. Film critic Shane Burridge noted that the film almost entirely removes the deaths and atrocities of World War II.

George Anderson gave the film a B rating in the Pittsburgh Post-Gazette as he felt it was an effective amalgamation of music and film footage. Phil Hall, writing for Film Threat, stated that it was "the most brilliantly reckless movie" he had ever seen and that it was tasteless, sassy, absurd, and avant-garde.

Michael Fremer watched the film in a Boston theater while high on LSD. He initially loved the film and invited prominent radio personalities and music and film critics to attend a showing. 10 minutes into the showing he realized that the film was terrible and criticized the poor quality of the Beatles covers.

== Soundtrack ==
All This and World War II

Soundtrack album by various artists
- Released: 25 October 1976
- Recorded: 1974–1976
- Genre: Rock
- Length: 98:45
- Labels: Riva (UK), 20th Century (US)
- Producer: Lou Reizner

Singles from All This and World War II
- 1. "Lucy in the Sky with Diamonds" Released: 18 November 1974; 2. "Let It Be" Released: 21 November 1975; 3. "Get Back" Released: November 1976; 4. "We Can Work It Out" Released: November 1976; 5. "Magical Mystery Tour" Released: January 1977

Professional ratings
Review scores
Source	Rating
AllMusic	2/5 stars
Rolling Stone	2/5 stars

Riva Records released the soundtrack in the United Kingdom before the film was released. Riva initially considered an advertising campaign before Christmas, but chose not to as the film would not be released in the United Kingdom until February. The album was released on 25 October 1976, and the film was released on 11 November 1976. Nicholas Schaffner noted that the advertising campaign for the record was as questionable as the film due to an ad depicting Hitler listening to the album.

The album reached number 23 on the UK Albums Chart, with a total of seven weeks on that listing, and number 48 on the Billboard Top 200. It also made number 14 on the Australian album charts, number 17 on the Dutch album charts and number 37 on the New Zealand album charts. The soundtrack is notable for featuring the solo recording debut of Peter Gabriel, formerly of Genesis, singing "Strawberry Fields Forever". The album was nominated for NARM Awards "Best Selling Movie Soundtrack".

A live concert featuring many of the artists who appeared on the soundtrack and album was planned for London's Olympia. However, the idea was abandoned due to difficulties in getting a date that all or most of the artists could make.

The LP was also released in 1979 with the title The Songs of John Lennon & Paul McCartney Performed by the World's Greatest Rock Artists, and two of the tracks ("Let It Be" performed by Leo Sayer and "Because" performed by Lynsey de Paul) were released on the Beatles cover version CD album With A Little Help that was issued in Europe in 1991.

The album was finally released on CD in 2006 on the Hip-O Select label and again in 2015 as a limited-issue release on the Culture Factory label, complete with the original gatefold sleeve. In 2016, a box set featuring the DVD of the 2016 re-edit of the film by Tony Palmer film and the soundtrack on two CD's was released by Gonzo Multimedia with the title The Beatles and World War II.

== Single releases ==
- Elton John’s rendition of "Lucy in the Sky with Diamonds", when previously released as a single in 1974, became a US and Canadian number one hit.
- Rod Stewart's version of "Get Back" was subsequently released and became a UK hit single (number 11).
- Ambrosia's cover of Magical Mystery Tour reached number 39 on the US Billboard Hot 100.

== Track listing ==
All tracks are written by Lennon–McCartney.

No.	Title	Artist	Length
1.	"Magical Mystery Tour"	Ambrosia	3:52
2.	"Lucy in the Sky with Diamonds" (Features John Lennon (under the pseudonym "Dr. Winston O'Boogie") on lead guitar & backing vocals)	Elton John	6:15
3.	"Golden Slumbers" / "Carry That Weight"	The Bee Gees	3:17
4.	"I Am the Walrus"	Leo Sayer	3:49
5.	"She's Leaving Home"	Bryan Ferry	3:07
6.	"Lovely Rita"	Roy Wood	1:13
7.	"When I'm Sixty-Four"	Keith Moon	2:36
8.	"Get Back"	Rod Stewart	4:24
9.	"Let It Be"	Leo Sayer	3:43
10.	"Yesterday"	David Essex	2:44
11.	"With a Little Help from My Friends"/"Nowhere Man"	Jeff Lynne	6:56
12.	"Because"	Lynsey de Paul	3:24
13.	"She Came In Through The Bathroom Window"	The Bee Gees	1:54
14.	"Michelle"	Richard Cocciante	4:00
15.	"We Can Work It Out"	The Four Seasons	2:39
16.	"The Fool on the Hill"	Helen Reddy	3:37
17.	"Maxwell's Silver Hammer"	Frankie Laine	3:27
18.	"Hey Jude"	The Brothers Johnson	4:58
19.	"Polythene Pam"	Roy Wood	1:30
20.	"Sun King"	The Bee Gees	2:03
21.	"Getting Better"	Status Quo	2:19
22.	"The Long and Winding Road"	Leo Sayer	4:47
23.	"Help!"	Henry Gross	3:07
24.	"Strawberry Fields Forever"	Peter Gabriel	2:30
25.	"A Day in the Life"	Frankie Valli	4:04
26.	"Come Together"	Tina Turner	4:08
27.	"You Never Give Me Your Money"	Wil Malone & Lou Reizner	3:04
28.	"The End"	The London Symphony Orchestra	2:26

== Personnel ==
- Barry Gibb – vocals
- Robin Gibb – vocals
- Maurice Gibb – vocals
- Nicky Hopkins – piano
- Les Hurdle – bass
- Barry Morgan – drums
- Ronnie Verrell – drums
- Wil Malone – orchestral arrangement
- Harry Rabinowitz – conductor
- David Measham – conductor

== Charts ==
Chart (1976)	Peak position
Australia (Kent Music Report)	14
Dutch Albums (Album Top 100)	17
New Zealand Albums (RMNZ)	37
UK Albums (Official Charts)	23
US Billboard 200	48

== See also ==
- List of artists who have covered the Beatles
- Brother, Can You Spare a Dime?, a 1975 documentary from the same producer that utilized a similar concept, but with contemporary music for the period
- The Atomic Cafe, a darkly satirical 1982 Cold War documentary similar in content

== Works cited ==
=== Books ===
- Johnson, Kim (1999). The First 28 Years of Monty Python. Thomas Dunne Books. ISBN 0312169337.
- Leigh, Spencer (1980). Stars In My Eyes - Personal Interviews With Top Music Stars. Raven Books. ISBN 0859770168.
- Marsh, Dave (1979). The Rolling Stone Record Guide. Rolling Stone. ISBN 0394410963.
- Schaffner, Nicholas (1978). The Beatles Forever. McGraw Hill Education. ISBN 0-07-055087-5.
- Schaffner, Nicholas (1980). The Boys From Liverpool: John, Paul, George, Ringo. Methuen Publishing. ISBN 0416306616.
- Whitburn, Joel (1983). Joel Whitburn's Top Pop: 1955-1982. Record Research. ISBN 0898200512.

=== Magazines ===
- "Anti-War Track Album To Precede Release Of Film". Billboard. Nielsen Holdings. November 6, 1976.

=== News ===
- "New DVD/CD "The Beatles and World War II" Features Star-Studded Collection of 1970s Fab Four Covers". ABC News Radio. July 13, 2016. Archived from the original on October 26, 2016.
- Dellar, Fred (May 9, 2022). "Beatles-Soundtracked War Film, All This And World War II, Released". Mojo. Archived from the original on June 12, 2025.
- Fremer, Michael; Lui, Malachi (July 3, 2019). "Michael & Malachi Exchange Thoughts on, Among Other Things, QRP's "White Album" Pressing". Analog Planet. Archived from the original on June 12, 2025.
- Hall, Phil (October 1, 2004). "The Bootleg Files: "All This and World War II"". Film Threat. Archived from the original on April 19, 2011.

=== Newspapers ===
- "Newsmakers". Coshocton Tribune. February 17, 1977. p. 9 – via Newspapers.com.
- Anderson, George (December 30, 1976). "'Network' Best Movie of December". Pittsburgh Post-Gazette. p. 6 – via Newspapers.com.
- Baltake, Joe (December 28, 1976). "Musical Mystery Tour Is Pointless Rock Film". Philadelphia Daily News. p. 30 – via Newspapers.com.
- Batchelor, Ruth (November 26, 1976). "A Mockumentary of W.W.II". Los Angeles Free Press.
- Gold, Aaron (January 21, 1977). "Henri Will Be Provided For". Santa Ana Register.
- Scott, Vernon (December 3, 1976). "New movie mixes rock sound with World War II". Daily Herald. p. Section 2 Page 3.
- Stein, Jerry (December 23, 1976). "The Beatles go to war and lose battle of taste". The Cincinnati Post. p. 21 – via Newspapers.com.
- Thomas, Kevin (November 12, 1976). "WWII and Beatles Are Ambushed". Los Angeles Times. p. 31 – via Newspapers.com.

=== Web ===
- "All This and World War II". American Film Institute. Archived from the original on June 12, 2025.
- Marinucci, Steve (July 12, 2016). "Beatles-Soundtracked War Film, All This And World War II, Released". AXS. Archived from the original on October 26, 2016.
