= Jorge Donn =

Argentine ballet dancer

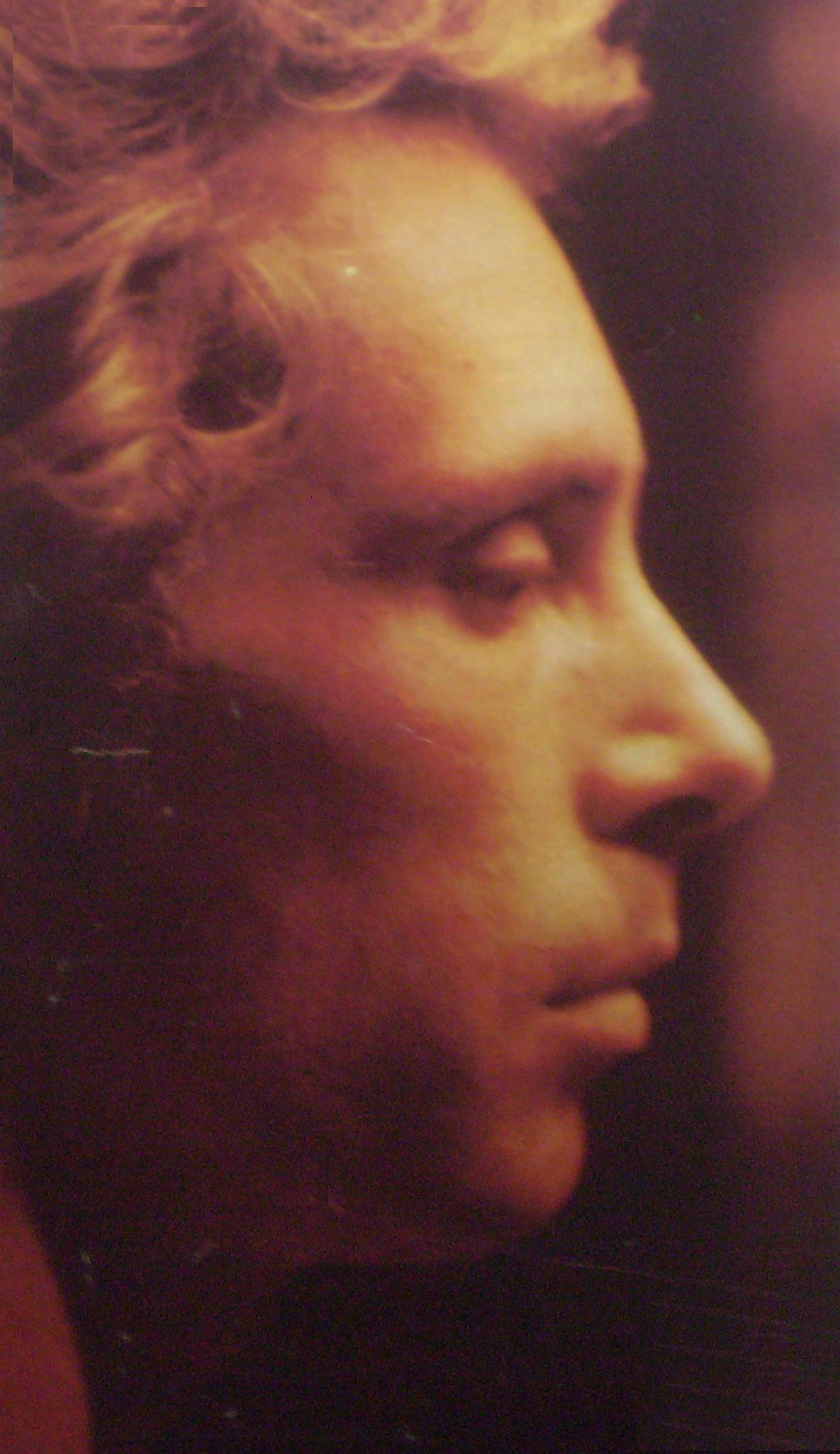
Jorge Donn in 1977

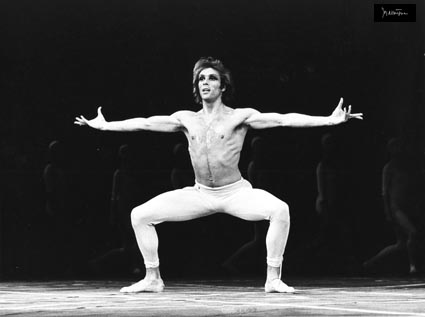
Jorge Donn performing IX Symphony Beethoven – choreography Maurice Bejart – Brussels 1976

Jorge Raúl Itovich Donn (Ciudad Jardin, Buenos Aires, 28 February 1947 – Lausanne, Switzerland, 30 November 1992) was an Argentine internationally known ballet dancer. He was best known for his work with Maurice Béjart's Ballet of the 20th Century. He died of AIDS on 30 November 1992 in Lausanne, Switzerland.

== Repertoire ==
Maurice Béjart

- 1964: Ninth Symphony by Beethoven (1967?)
- 1966: Webern Opus V, Roméo et Juliette
- 1967: la Messe pour le temps présent
- 1968: Bhakti
- 1970: Serait-ce la mort?, Firebird, Sonate N°5
- 1971: The Rite of Spring, Songs of a Wayfarer, Nijinsky, Clown of God
- 1972: Symphony for a Lonely Man
- 1973: Sonate à trois, Golestan ou le jardin des roses
- 1974: The Triumphs of Petrarch, Ce que l'amour me dit
- 1975: Notre Faust
- 1976: Le Molière imaginaire
- 1977: Héliogabale, Petrouchka
- 1978: Gaîte parisienne, Ce que la mort me dit, Leda (with Maya Plisetskaya)
- 1979: Boléro by Ravel (first male performer), Mephisto Waltz
- 1980: Eros Thanatos
- 1981: Adagietto by Mahler, Light
- 1982: Vienna, Vienna, Only You
- 1983: Messe pour le temps futur
- 1984: Dionysos
- 1985: Le concours
- 1986: Malraux ou la métamorphose des dieux
- 1987: Souvenir de Leningrad, ... and Waltz
- 1988: Dybbuk, A force de partir, je suis resté chez moi

George Balanchine

- 1977: Vienna Waltzes, Bugaku

== Filmography ==
- 1975: Je suis né à Venise by Maurice Béjart — as Jorge / The Sun
- 1978: Flesh Color by François Weyergans — as Ramón
- 1981: Les Uns et les Autres by Claude Lelouch — as Boris Itovitch / Sergei Itovitch
- 1990: There Were Days... and Moons by Claude Lelouch — as dancer (uncredited)
