= Brother, Can You Spare a Dime? (film) =

1975 film by Philippe Mora

- Image Entertainment 1999 DVD cover
- Directed by: Philippe Mora
- Written by: Philippe Mora
- Produced by: David Puttnam; Sandy Lieberson
- Edited by: Jeremy Thomas
- Production company: Goodtimes Enterprises
- Distributed by: Visual Programme Systems Ltd. Dimension Pictures (US)
- Release date: 1975
- Running time: 110 min.
- Countries: United Kingdom; United States
- Language: English
- Box office: $1.4 million

Brother, Can You Spare a Dime? is a 1975 documentary film directed by Philippe Mora, consisting largely of newsreel footage and contemporary film clips to portray the era of the Great Depression.

== Summary ==
The film serves as a nostalgic and evocative scrapbook of the Depression from the Wall Street crash of 1929 to the Attack on Pearl Harbor.

== Cast ==
- The Andrews Sisters
- Fred Astaire
- Warner Baxter
- Jack Benny
- Busby Berkeley
- Willie Best
- Humphrey Bogart
- George Burns
- James Cagney
- Cab Calloway
- Eddie Cantor
- Hobart Cavanaugh
- George Chandler
- Charlie Chaplin
- Winston Churchill
- Betty Compson
- Gary Cooper
- Bing Crosby
- Frankie Darro
- Cecil B. DeMille
- Marlene Dietrich
- John Dillinger
- Walt Disney
- James Dunn
- Cliff Edwards
- Dwight D. Eisenhower
- Bill Elliot
- Madge Evans
- Stepin Fetchit
- W. C. Fields
- Dick Foran
- Gerald Ford
- Clark Gable
- Benny Goodman
- Cary Grant
- Woody Guthrie
- Gabby Hayes
- Billie Holiday
- Herbert Hoover
- J. Edgar Hoover
- Lyndon B. Johnson
- John F. Kennedy
- Joe Louis
- Richard Nixon
- Paul Robeson
- Eleanor Roosevelt
- Franklin D. Roosevelt
- James Stewart
- Shirley Temple

== Selected films featured ==
- King Kong
- I Am a Fugitive from a Chain Gang
- Citizen Kane
- His Girl Friday
- Wild Boys of the Road
- The Roaring Twenties
- American Madness
- Mr. Smith Goes to Washington
- Gold Diggers of 1933
- Lady Killer
- G Men
- Hollywood Steps Out
- Stand Up and Cheer!

== Accolades ==
1976: Nominated - Golden Globe Award for Best Documentary Film

== Home media ==
A DVD from Image Entertainment was released in 1999 and again in 2018 by Artiflix. It was also released on DVD and Blu-Ray via The Sprocket Vault.

== See also ==
- All This and World War II, a similar 1976 'scrapbook' documentary about World War II scored to the music of the Beatles.
- America, Lost and Found, a similar 1979 film essay also about the Depression years.
