= Lisztomania (film) =

1975 film by Ken Russell

- Theatrical release poster
- Directed by: Ken Russell
- Written by: Ken Russell
- Based on: Nélida; 1848 book by Marie d'Agoult
- Produced by: Roy Baird; David Puttnam
- Starring: Roger Daltrey; Sara Kestelman; Paul Nicholas; Ringo Starr; Rick Wakeman
- Cinematography: Peter Suschitzky
- Edited by: Stuart Baird
- Music by: Rick Wakeman; Franz Liszt; Richard Wagner
- Production companies: Goodtimes Enterprises; Visual Programme Systems Ltd.
- Distributed by: Warner Bros.
- Release date: 10 October 1975
- Running time: 103 minutes
- Country: United Kingdom
- Language: English
- Budget: £603,249 or £1.2 million

Lisztomania is a 1975 British surreal biographical musical comedy film written and directed by Ken Russell about the 19th-century composer Franz Liszt. The screenplay is derived, in part, from the book Nélida (1848) by Marie d'Agoult, about her affair with Liszt.

Depicting the flamboyant Liszt as the first classical pop star, Lisztomania features contemporary rock star Roger Daltrey (of the Who) as Franz Liszt. The film was released the same year as Tommy, which also starred Daltrey and was also directed by Russell.

Rick Wakeman, from the progressive rock band Yes, composed the Lisztomania soundtrack, which included synthesiser arrangements of works by Liszt and Richard Wagner. He also appears in the film as Thor, the Nordic god of thunder. Daltrey and Russell wrote the lyrics for the soundtrack, and Daltrey provided vocals. Of the other rock celebrities appearing in the film, Ringo Starr appears as the Pope.

The term Lisztomania was coined by the German romantic literary figure Heinrich Heine to describe the massive public response to Liszt's virtuosic piano performances. At these performances, there were allegedly screaming women, and the audience sometimes was limited to standing room only.

This film was first to use the new Dolby Stereo sound system.

== Plot ==
The film tells of Liszt's life through surrealistic episodes blending fact, fantasy, and anachronistic elements. At the start, Liszt is caught in bed with Marie d'Agoult by her husband, the Count d'Agoult. The count challenges Liszt to a sabre fight, but Marie begs the count to let her share Liszt's fate. The count's staff traps Liszt and Marie in the body of a piano and leaves it on railroad tracks.

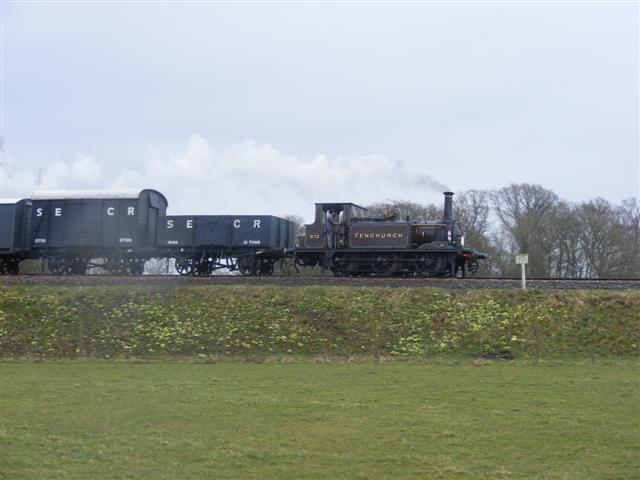
This 19th century steam engine on the Bluebell Railway was featured in the film

This is shown to be a flashback triggered by the camera-flash of photographers backstage before one of Liszt's concerts. Liszt introduces Richard Wagner to his colleagues, including Gioachino Rossini, Hector Berlioz, Frédéric Chopin, and Hans von Bülow. Liszt pays Wagner to let him perform a variation on a theme from Rienzi. At the concert, Wagner is put off by Liszt's crowd-pleasing showmanship at the expense of serious musicianship, which includes adding the melody of Chopsticks to his Rienzi variation. However, the crowd, consisting largely of young screaming girls, go wild at Liszt's performance, storming the stage. Liszt uses von Bülow to proposition potentially wealthy females in the audience. One is Princess Carolyn, who gives Liszt her address in Russia.

Marie's and Liszt's domestic life is plagued by jealousy over his constant touring and infidelities. They now have three children, the oldest being Cosima. Domestic life has strained Liszt's creativity. Liszt prepares to depart to St. Petersburg to play for the Tsar. Marie threatens to abandon him if he goes. Liszt tells Cosima that he would sell his soul to the devil to compose brilliant music again. Cosima says she will pray to God every day, so that Liszt will meet the devil and sell his soul to him.

Carolyn seduces him, offering him the ability to compose brilliant music in exchange for total control of his life. In an ostentatious scene, Liszt hallucinates a dance sequence with the women of Carolyn's court while Carolyn sinisterly observes from afar. The women then drag Liszt and his oversized erection to a guillotine: Carolyn reveals that the bargain for Liszt's newfound musical prolificacy is the forfeiture of his libertinism.

Next, Liszt, in Dresden during the May Uprising, is conflicted about not supporting his friends in the revolt and spending all his time isolated to compose music (it is heavily implied that Marie and his two youngest children have been killed). Wagner asks Liszt for money so he can escape the country with his family. Wagner drugs Liszt and reveals himself to be a vampire with a mission to write music inspiring a new German nationalism. He sucks Liszt's blood and composes on the piano. Before departing, Wagner leaves him his latest political pamphlet, a Superman comic (a play on Friedrich Nietzsche's Superman).

Liszt and Carolyn travel to the Vatican to get married after the Pope agrees to grant her a divorce from her husband. The wedding ultimately is voided by the intervention of her husband and the Tsar. A furious Carolyn threatens to write an anthology on her disagreements with the church (Causes intérieures de la faiblesse extérieure de l'Église en 1870). Liszt joins the church as an abbé.

The Pope tells Liszt that Wagner has married Cosima and leads a devilish cult organized around his music. He orders Liszt to exorcize him and return him to the Christian faith or else Liszt will be excommunicated and his music banned.

Liszt travels to Wagner's castle, where Wagner and Cosima perform a secret Nazi ritual dressed in Superman costumes. Liszt confronts Wagner, who built a mechanical Viking Siegfried to rid the country of Jews. Wagner reveals himself to Liszt as a vampire and threatens to steal his music so that Wagner's Viking can live. Liszt plays music to exorcise Wagner. Cosima imprisons Liszt and resurrects Wagner in a Nazi ceremony as a Frankenstein-Hitler wielding a machine-gun guitar. Cosima leads the Wagner-Hitler to gun down the town's Jews and kills Liszt with a voodoo doll.

In Heaven, Liszt is reunited with the women he romanced in his life and Cosima, who live in harmony. Liszt and the women fly to Earth in a spaceship to destroy Wagner-Hitler. Liszt sings that he has found "peace at last".

== Cast ==
- Roger Daltrey as Franz Liszt
- Sara Kestelman as Princess Carolyn
- Paul Nicholas as Richard Wagner
- Fiona Lewis as Marie d'Agoult
- Veronica Quilligan as Cosima Wagner
- Ringo Starr as The Pope
- Rick Wakeman as Thor
- John Justin as Count d'Agoult
- Andy Reilly as Hans von Bulow
- Nell Campbell as Olga Janina
- David English as Captain
- Imogen Claire as George Sand
- Rikki Howard as Countess
- David Corti as Daniel
- Anulka Dziubinska as Lola Montez
- Lucy Willers as Blandine
- Felicity Devonshire as Governess

The cast featured cameos by actors from director Ken Russell's recurring ensemble, making brief appearances as other well known composers, including: Murray Melvin as Hector Berlioz, Andrew Faulds as Johann Strauss II, Kenneth Colley as Frédéric Chopin (credited as Ken Colley, as in his other Russell works), and Otto Diamant as Felix Mendelssohn.

== Production ==
=== Background ===
David Puttnam's company Goodtimes planned to make a series of six films about composers, all to be directed by Ken Russell. Subjects were to include Franz Liszt, George Gershwin, Berlioz and Vaughan Williams; the first one was Mahler (1974), which had been a minor success. In July 1974, Russell said he wanted Mick Jagger to play Liszt because Liszt had been "the first pop star".

Puttnam says he wanted to follow it with a biopic of Gershwin starring Al Pacino but claims Russell just made Tommy and wanted to make a film about Liszt with Roger Daltrey. The two films contain several thematic connections, including the public perception of stardom and virtuosity, and the Romantic aspects of contemporary music and film. Russell wrote he had written films about both Liszt and Gershwin—the latter was called The Gershwin Dream and it was Puttnam who chose Liszt; Russell say this was "probably" because Russell wanted to play Liszt.

In October 1974, Russell announced Roger Daltrey would play Liszt. "Liszt's music is just like modern day rock," said Daltrey in November. "He was a lot like me... he had this religious thing like me but he still went lusting after women." "Roger is a natural, brilliant performer," said Russell. "He acts as he sings and the results are magical. He also has a curious quality of innocence which is why he was a perfect Tommy and why he is the only person to play Liszt."

In December 1974, Mayfair announced it signed a deal to distribute five films made by Russell and Goodtimes started with one on Liszt.

In February 1975 Russell said Marty Feldman was to play Wagner. The same month, the title was changed from Liszt to Lisztomania.

=== Production notes ===
- Puttnam said "The problem was he [Russell] never finished his screenplay, and frankly, he just seemed to go off his rocker." Russell said he was most intrigued by Liszt's relationship with Wagner, but Puttnam "was more at home at a pop concert than in the concert hall. He threw out my first script for being too straight and urged me to write another emphasising the pop element."
- Press materials claimed Russell's script was 57 pages. (A rule of thumb in the movie industry is that one page of screenplay typically corresponds to one minute of screentime; however, Lisztomania was 103 minutes long.)
- Russell later wrote that "I was playing Trilby to his [Puttnam's] Svengali". He claims it was Puttnam who suggested Ringo Starr play a supporting role, got Rick Wakeman to do the music, and suggested Russell go anamorphic.
- Daltrey said he found the part difficult because he had no lines in Tommy and could not play the piano.
- Puttnam said "the film was rocketing over budget and every time I got back from raising money, the budget had gone up again. I did my best but it was a nightmare, impossible to keep up with."
- Sanford Lieberson of Goodtimes said Russell "went off the deep end" forcing Lieberson and Puttnam to put their own money into the film.
- "The film's going to be like Tom Jones riding in Blazing Saddles," said Russell.

== Reception ==
=== Box office ===
The film was a box-office flop and ended the plans for Goodtimes Enterprises to make more films with Russell.

=== Critical reception ===
Roger Ebert of the Chicago Sun-Times gave the film three out of four stars and called it "a berserk exercise of demented genius, and on that level (I want to make my praise explicit) it functions and sometimes even works. Most people will probably despise it." Richard Eder of The New York Times wrote that for the first half-hour the film is "manic and extremely funny. Then it relapses into a noisy bit of pretentiousness in the manner of its predecessor, Tommy, full of flashing lights, satin spacesuits, chrome-lucite furniture and mock agony." Gene Siskel of the Chicago Tribune gave the film one star out of four and wrote that "Russell fills the screen with enough outlandish sexual imagery to render one's senses numb. The film's publicists would have you believe Lisztomania is outrageous; on the contrary, it's just boring." Kevin Thomas of the Los Angeles Times called it "a buoyant, consistently coherent and imaginative film that is alternately—and sometimes simultaneously—outrageous, hilarious and poignant." Gary Arnold of The Washington Post wrote that "it becomes painfully evident that Russell, the Great Vulgarian of contemporary filmmaking, should have quit while he was ahead, sort of. A boudoir-farce approach to the life and legend of Liszt would have been trivial-minded, but harmlessly trivial-minded compared to the collection of obscene fantasies and gassy profundities Russell resorts to after his muse runs out of comic ideas." Pauline Kael wrote "In a couple of sequences, it erupts successfully with a wholehearted, comic-strip craziness, but for all his lashing himself into a slapstick fury, the director Ken Russell can't seem to pull the elements of film making together."

In a review for Die Zeit, Hans-Christoph Blumenberg summed up the film as follows:

With Russell, who had succeeded in producing an artist portrait of bizarre precision with Mahler, Lisztomania is only a tiring litany of cabaret numbers, which, by means of anachronisms, pseudo-critical analogies, and daring casting choices (for example, Ringo Starr as a pope) gains conviction... In Lisztomania, an exorbitantly vicious berserker drifts in the ruins of his talent, loses himself in an abundance of highly disparate incidents, which nevertheless only end in shrill monotony."

Another German reviewer, Hans J. Wulff, devoted a six-page article to the film, and commented:

The films break with the tradition of biographical narration and stage music and music culture in a wild collage in which heterogeneous material is brought together. Lisztomania is the most misjudged of all films of Russell, at the same time most complex and still most irritating... The fascination of Lisztomania is the method. The entire [Western] cultural history is the material with which Russell designs his montage, indifferent whether it is high or trivial culture. Much cultural knowledge, though highly controlled, is the theme of the film, giving it expression and vividness."

Leonard Maltin's Movie Guide gave the film one and a half stars out of four, while the Golden Movie Retriever said "WOOF!"

The film holds a 50% rating on Rotten Tomatoes, based on 10 reviews.

Russell later said "he got off on the wrong foot" with the film which "called for a bigger budget than we had so the film doesn't work as well as I wanted it to. The symbolism moreover is a bit too relentless and the fantasy sequences tend to submerge the reality of the characters. I think I had exhausted the vein of biographies of composers at the time."
