= Peter Eyre =

American-English actor (born 1942)

Peter Gervaise Joseph Eyre (born 11 March 1942) is an American-English actor.

Eyre was born on 11 March 1942 in New York City, the son of Dorothy Pelline (née Acton) and Edward Joseph Eyre, a banker. He was sent to a public school in England at the age of 12, and has been based in the country ever since.

Although offered a place at the Royal Academy of Dramatic Art at the age of 18, he studied acting in Paris. His career in the theatre includes work with the Old Vic (his professional debut), the Royal Shakespeare Company, and The Old Vic Theatre Company

== Filmography ==
- Having a Wild Weekend (1965) - Art Director (uncredited)
- Julius Caesar (1970) - Cinna the Poet
- The Rivals of Sherlock Holmes (1971, TV Series) - George Fitzwilliam
- The Pied Piper (1972, by Jacques Demy) - Priest
- Mahler (1974, by Ken Russell) - Otto Mahler
- Hedda (1975) - Jørgen Tesman
- Luna (1979, by Bernardo Bertolucci) - Edward
- Dragonslayer (1981) - Casiodorus Rex
- Maurice (1987, by James Ivory) - Rev. Borenius
- Just Ask for Diamond (1988) - Gott
- Mountains of the Moon (1990) - Norton Shaw
- Let Him Have It (1991) - Humphreys
- Orlando (1992) - Pope
- The Remains of the Day (1993, by James Ivory) - Lord Halifax
- Princess Caraboo (1994) - Lord Apthorpe
- Surviving Picasso (1996, by James Ivory) - Sabartes
- The Tango Lesson (1997, by Sally Potter) - English Tango Fan
- Dangerous Beauty (1998) - The Doge
- Merlin (1998, TV Mini-Series) - Chief Physician
- Friends (1998, TV Series) - the registrar
- Midsomer Murders (1999, TV Series) - Leonard Pike (in S2:E2 “Strangler’s Wood”)
- Alice in Wonderland (1999, TV Movie) - Frogface Footman
- The Golden Bowl (2000, by James Ivory) - A.R. Jarvis, Shopkeeper
- From Hell (2001) - Lord Hallsham
- The Affair of the Necklace (2001) - Monsieur Bassenge
- The Situation (2006) - U.S. Ambassador
- Shadows in the Sun (2009) - Jonathan / 'Prospero'
