= Mahler (film) =

- British theatrical release poster
- Directed by: Ken Russell
- Written by: Ken Russell
- Produced by: Roy Baird
- Starring: Robert Powell; Georgina Hale; Lee Montague
- Cinematography: Dick Bush
- Edited by: Michael Bradsell
- Music by: Gustav Mahler; Richard Wagner
- Production company: Goodtimes Enterprises
- Distributed by: Visual Programme Systems Ltd.
- Release date: 4 April 1974
- Running time: 115 minutes
- Country: United Kingdom
- Language: English
- Budget: £168,000–£193,000

Mahler is a 1974 British biographical film based on the life of Austro-Bohemian composer Gustav Mahler. It was written and directed by Ken Russell for Goodtimes Enterprises, and starred Robert Powell as Gustav Mahler and Georgina Hale as Alma Mahler. The film was entered into the 1974 Cannes Film Festival, where it won the Technical Grand Prize.

== Plot ==
The opening credits begin with a little hut on a pier on an idyllic lake exploding in flames; then a cocooned woman struggles to break free of her white wrappings in an outdoor setting near a rough rock carving of Mahler’s head.

The structure of the film is that Mahler and his wife Alma have returned to Europe from his time conducting in the United States, and are on the train to Vienna. People are thronging the platforms to greet him at each station, but he makes Alma draw the blinds and will not listen to the people's speeches or receive their bouquets. Instead, various incidents on the train trigger his memories or visions, and we see them. Alma’s lover Max is also on the train, urging her to leave Mahler and get off with him a couple of stops before Vienna.

The idyllic hut on the pier is seen in the first flashback: Mahler is trying to compose in it, and he gets Alma to go around the whole lake hushing the animals and people who are making noise. She succeeds at this by persuasion and giving out beer.

A woman who agrees to change compartments with the couple comments that Mahler’s newly composed Ninth Symphony is all about death; this upsets him, as does someone else’s dictum that after Beethoven no composer can ever write more than nine symphonies. He has a heart attack and a doctor on the train tends and revives him, but he has a vision of being alive in a windowed coffin while Alma and Max ignore his pleas, carry on with each other and cremate him.

Other flashbacks include a visit to the Emperor of Austria Franz Josef about a music director job. Franz Josef is far too young for the early 1900s, when the movie is set, and makes more and more outrageous demands on Mahler, ending by making him expose the physical evidence that he is Jewish and rejecting him on those grounds. It turns out this is not the real Emperor but Mahler's friend Hugo Wolf, who thinks he is the Emperor, and the locale is the asylum. In another episode, Alma wants to compose music too and Mahler's lead singer sings her song, but Mahler tells her her job is wife and mother and composition is too stressful, citing their mad friend and Mahler's brother, whose lack of success at it led to his mental breakdown and suicide. Alma sadly buries her song in the woods and mourns over it.

Mahler's conversion to Catholicism is expressed by a fantasy sequence in which he undergoes a baptism of fire and blood on a mountaintop, presided over by Cosima Wagner, whose influence as Richard Wagner's widow means her anti-Semitism is a powerful force in the music world. She is depicted goose-stepping around in black-lipped makeup, wearing a Prussian helmet and a bathing suit with a cross on the front and a swastika on the rear.

In a final flashback, Alma is very upset and attacks him in the hut on the pier because he wrote the song cycle Songs on the Death of Children (Kindertotenlieder). This is conflated with the actual death of one of his children, but that really happened years later.

The doctor on the train who tended him tells him he is in perfect health. Mahler tells Alma she has the choice of getting off before Vienna with Max at his stop or staying with him. She wants to know if he has ever put her before his music; he says all his music is about and for her, that she is his music. He tells her that the 2nd theme of his Sixth Symphony is her. They kiss, and Max gets off without her. Mahler is then cheerful enough to show himself at the train window and accept the bouquets from fans.

They arrive at Vienna, where the doctor reports to Mahler's regular doctor by phone; the latter reveals that Mahler is very ill and only has a week or two to live. The train doctor meets the happy couple as they walk through the station and starts to tell Mahler the true state of his health; but Mahler says he does not need to hear it because he and Alma are going to live forever.

== Cast ==
- Robert Powell as Gustav Mahler
  - Gary Rich as Young Gustav
- Georgina Hale as Alma Mahler
- Lee Montague as Bernhard Mahler
- Miriam Karlin as Aunt Rosa
- Rosalie Crutchley as Marie Mahler
- Richard Morant as Max
- Angela Down as Justine Mahler
- Antonia Ellis as Cosima Wagner
- Ronald Pickup as Nick
- Peter Eyre as Otto Mahler
- Dana Gillespie as Anna von Mildenburg
- George Coulouris as Doctor Roth
- David Collings as Hugo Wolf
- Arnold Yarrow as Grandfather
- David Trevena as Doctor Richter
- Elaine Delmar as Princess
- Benny Lee as Uncle Arnold
- Andrew Faulds as Doctor On Train
- Otto Diamant as Professor Sladky
- Michael Southgate as Alois Mahler
- Ken Colley as Siegfried Krenek
- Sarah McClellan as Putzi
- Claire McClellan as Glucki
- Oliver Reed as Station Master

The music score of the movie consists of recordings by the Royal Concertgebouw Orchestra conducted by Bernard Haitink.

== Production ==
Russell had long been an admirer of Mahler's music. He said he based the film on "the rondo form in music where you present the theme and follow it with variations, then return to the theme and so on. My theme was the composer's last train journey before he died. During the journey we flash back to incidents in his life, the variations on the theme as it were. They vary from passion to comedy. Like the scherzos from his symphonies some of the scenes are pretty grotesque, too."

David Puttnam's company Goodtimes planned to make a series of six films about composers, all to be directed by Ken Russell. Subjects were to include Franz Liszt, George Gershwin, Ralph Vaughan Williams and Richard Wagner; they decided to do Mahler first. The National Film Finance Corporation removed its support prior to filming meaning Puttnam had to slash the budget from £400,000 to £180,000. Russell says the film had German backers who also pulled out before filming began, forcing the movie to be shot in England and not in Germany. Russell says Puttnam had no creative input into the film in contrast with their next collaboration, Lisztomania.

Some outdoor sections of the film were made in Borrowdale, in the English Lake District.

The film included a parody of Luchino Visconti's film Death in Venice, which Russell disliked. "Dirk [Bogarde] gave the worst performance of his life in Death in Venice", said Russell. "His characterization had nothing to do with Mahler. Mahler was never decaying, never sorry for himself, never given to dreaming of the past. The whole thing was a bit cheeky on Visconti's part and very lazy. He played the very same Mahler theme in every scene."

== Reception ==
In America, Mayfair Film Group, founded by programmer/screenwriter Jerry Harvey, released the film in 4-track magnetic stereo, in a slow rollout that began in Los Angeles on February 26, 1975.

According to one account, by 1985 the film recorded a net loss of £14,000. However, Sandy Lieberson of Goodtimes said that "the film sold everywhere and made a tidy profit." Russell also said the film made a profit but claimed in 1991 he had never seen any of his share.

Russell only ended up making one more film with Puttnam, Lisztomania. It was meant to be followed by a film about Wagner, though it was never made.
