= Josef Danhauser =

Austrian painter (1805–1845)

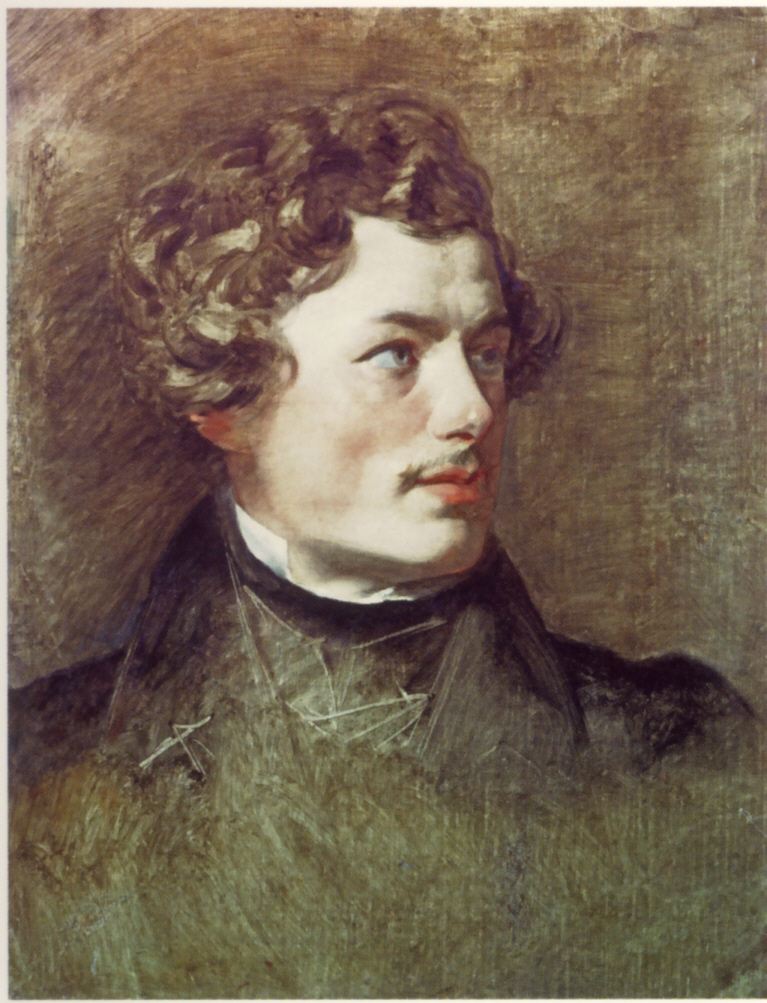
A 19th century portrait of Danhauser

Josef Franz Danhauser (19 August 1805 in Laimgrube, currently part of Mariahilf or Neubau–4 May 1845) was a painter from the Austrian Empire. He was one of the prominent artists of Biedermeier period, along with Ferdinand Georg Waldmüller, Peter Fendi, and others. Danhauser's works, which went largely unappreciated in his time, dealt with moralising subjects and had a clear influence of William Hogarth.

== Early life and education ==
Danhauser was born in Vienna in 1805, the eldest son of sculptor and furniture manufacturer Joseph Ulrich Danhauser and his wife Johanna (née Lambert). He took his first painting lessons with his father and later assisted the Vienna Academy of Fine Arts. He studied with Johann Peter Krafft and made his first exhibition in 1826.

Invited by Johann Ladislaus Pyrker, patriarch of Venice, Danhauser visited Doges, where he started to study the Italian masters. He returned to Vienna via Trieste in 1827, visiting Prague. On 27 March 1827, he and his colleague de:Johann Matthias Ranftl molded Ludwig van Beethoven's death mask, roughly 12 hours after his death and Danhauser painted a water-colour representing his deathbed. In 1828, he spent some time in Eger, with an invitation of this Hungarian city archbishop Pyrker. He solicited him for some pictures for the gallery of the Archdiocese.

== Career ==
After his father's death in 1829, his brothers and he managed his furniture factory during the Biedermeier movement, being the precursors of modern design. That made him put his painting career aside.

In 1833, Danhauser responded to a second invitation from Eger's archbishop, and he painted The martyr of Saint John for a new basilica in the city, and he received the Vienna Academy prize for his picture Die Verstoßung der Hagar, and he specialised in Genre works. In 1838, he was appointed vice-rector of the Academy and married Josephine Streit, who was the daughter of a physician and with whom he had three children, Josef, Marie and Julie, born in 1839, 1841 and 1843 respectively.

Danhauser was appointed professor of historical painting at the academy in 1841, but left to travel around Germany and the Netherlands with the textile maker, art aficionado, and art sponsor Rudolf von Arthaber. In this journey, he was very interested in the Dutch School and the format of his works was smaller. He died of typhus in Vienna in 1845 and was buried in Hundstrumer Cemetery, though his grave was later moved. In 1862, a street was named after him in Vienna.

=== Works ===
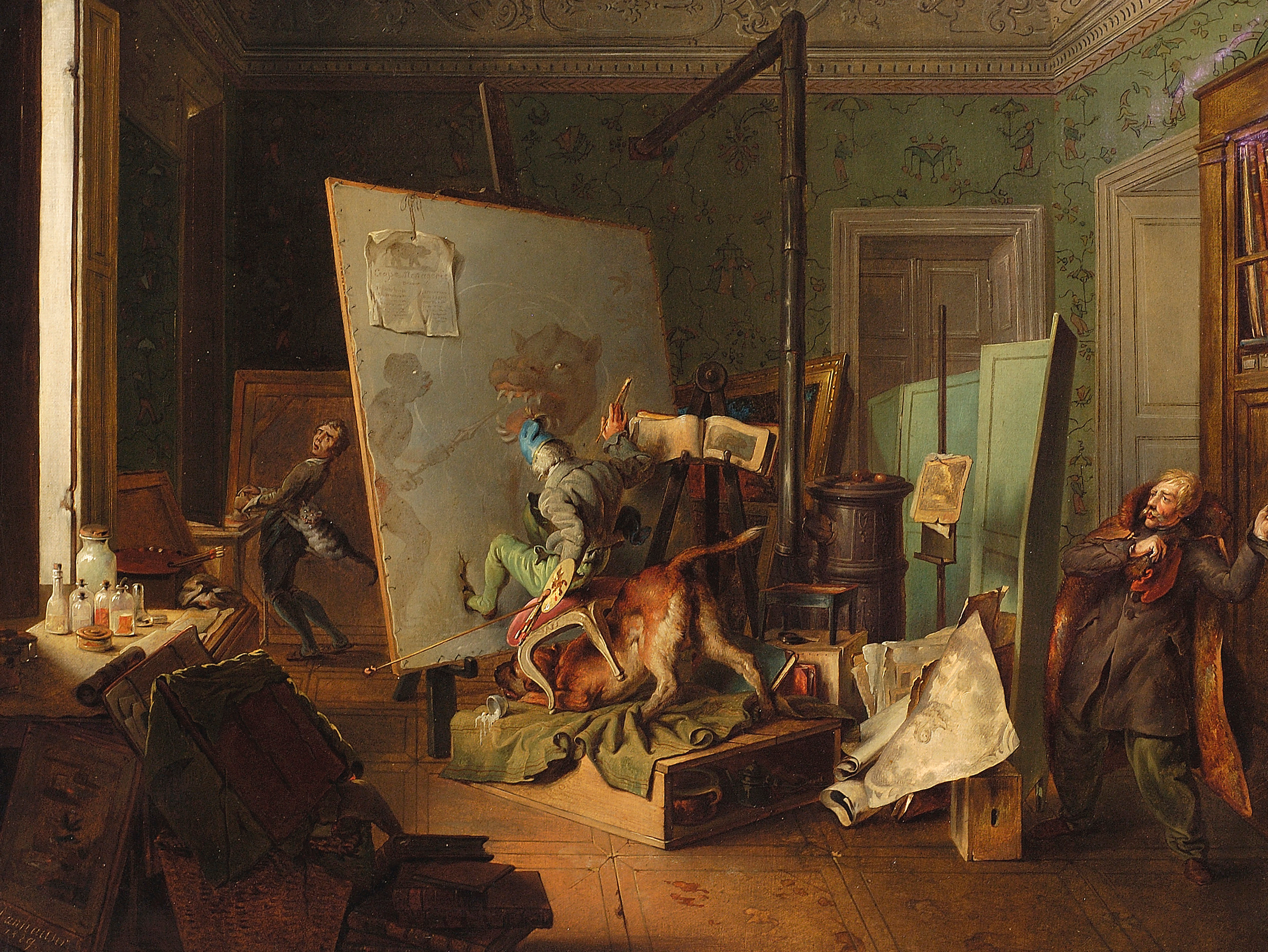
Komische Szene in einem Maleratelier (1829)

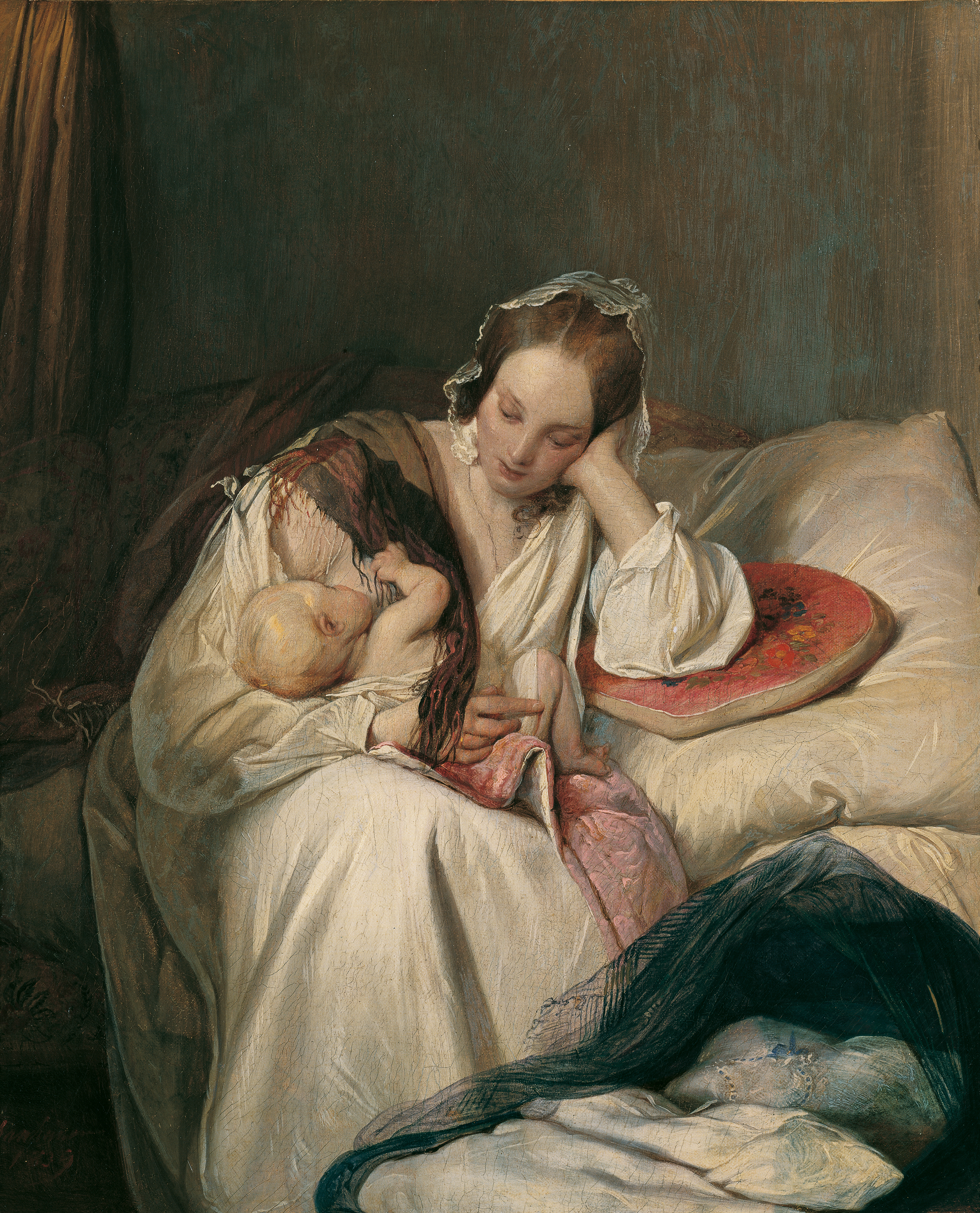
Die Mutterliebe (1839)

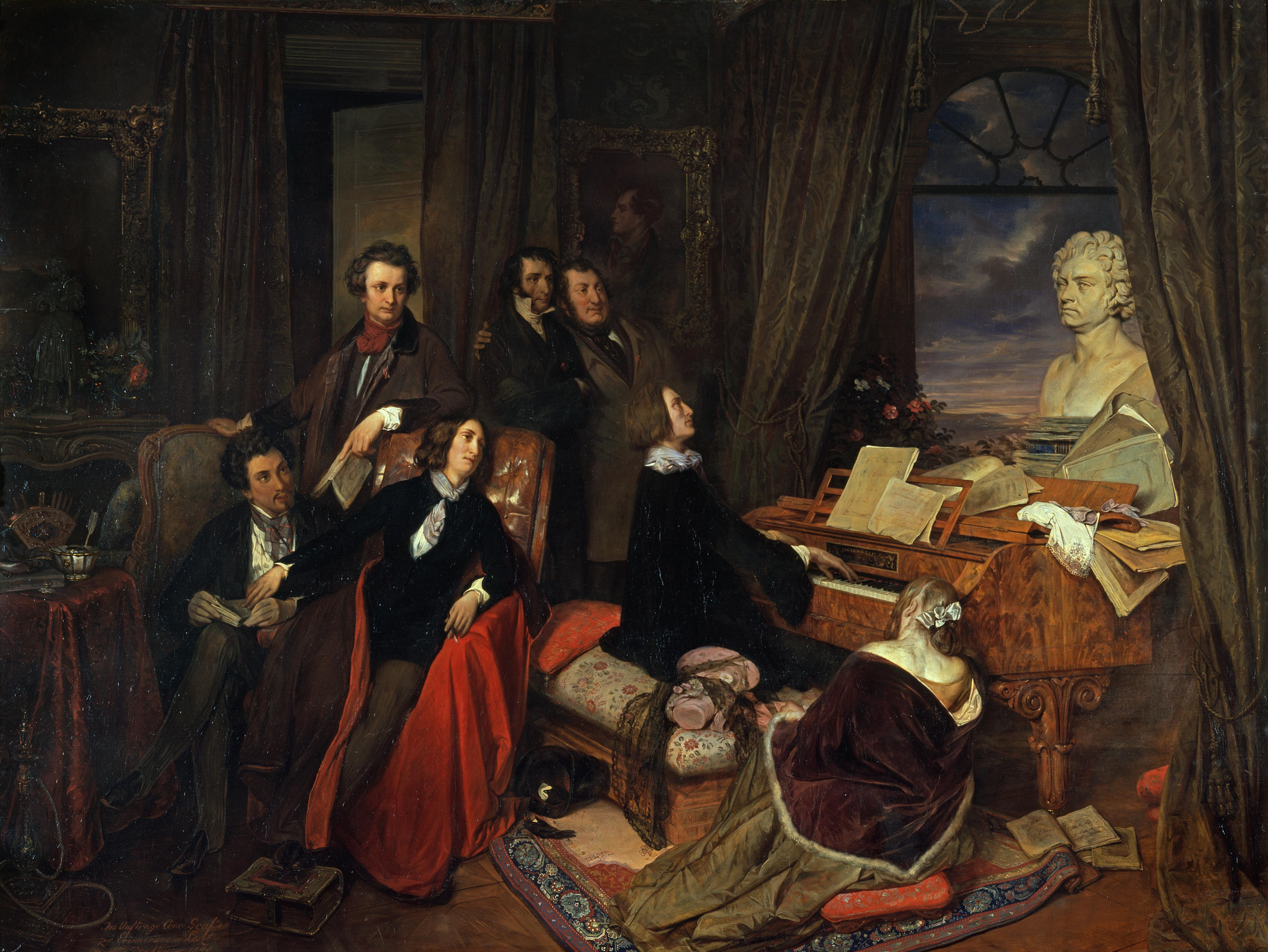
Liszt at the Piano, an 1840 portrait by Danhauser and commissioned by Conrad Graf featuring an imagined gathering, including (sitting) Alfred de Musset or Alexandre Dumas, père, George Sand, Franz Liszt, Marie d'Agoult, and (standing) Hector Berlioz or Victor Hugo, Niccolò Paganini, Gioachino Rossini, a bust of Beethoven on the Graf grand piano, a portrait of Byron on the wall, and a statue of Joan of Arc on the far left. The portrait is now housed at Staatliche Museen zu Berlin in Berlin.

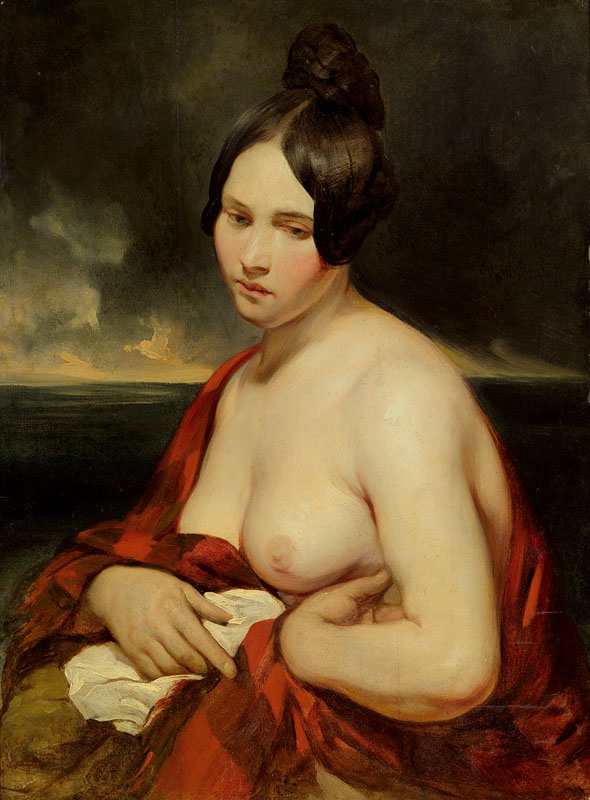
Die Frau vom Meer (1840)

- Rudolf von Habsburg und der Einsiedler in der Kapelle von Lilienfeld (1825), oil on canvas, 0.727 x 0.588, Budapest, Szépművészeti Múzeum
- Wallenstein ersticht sich im Zelte Ottokars - Szene aus Pyrkers Rudolphias (1825), oil on canvas, 0.59 x 0.738, Budapest, Szépművészeti Múzeum
- Ottokar erklärt Rudolf auf dem Turnierplatz mitten im Sturm den Krieg (1825), oil on canvas, 0.603 x 0.741, Wien Museum
- Das Scholarenzimmer eines Malers (1828), oil on canvas, 0.40 x 0.52, Vienna, Österreichische Galerie Belvedere
- Komische Szene in einem Maleratelier (1829), oil on canvas, 0.365 x 0.495, Vienna, Österreichische Galerie Belvedere
- Bildnis eines Knaben (1829), oil on canvas, 0.42 x 0.345, Wien Museum
- Porträt Ladislaus Pyrkers, oil on paper, 0.32 x 0.26, Vienna, Österreichische Galerie Belvedere
- Maleratelier mit Jeanne d'Arc (1830), oil on canvas, 0.78 x 1.035, Budapest, Szépművészeti Múzeum
- Selbstporträt (1830–1835), oil on wood, 0.233 x 0.20, Wien Museum
- Die Schlafenden (1831), oil on canvas, 0.685 x 0.51, Budapest, Szépművészeti Múzeum
- Ottokars Tod (1832), oil on canvas, 1.035 x 0.845, Budapest, Szépművészeti Múzeum
- Der letzte Kampf zwischen Rudolf und Ottokar (1832), oil on canvas, 0.585 x 0.695, Budapest, Szépművészeti Múzeum
- Porträt der Frau von Streit, der Schwiegermutter des Künstlers (1833), oil on canvas, 0.92 x 0.715, Linz, Oberösterreichischen Landesmuseen
- Abraham verstößt Hagar (1833), oil on canvas, Vienna, Österreichische Galerie Belvedere
- Das Bekenntnis (1834), oil on canvas, 1.28 x 0.96, Wien Museum
- Die Frau des Fischers mit ihrem Kinde (1835), oil on wood, 0.41 x 0.49, private collection.
- Der reiche Prasser (1836), oil on canvas, 0.855 x 1.33, Vienna, Österreichische Galerie Belvedere
- Der abgewiesene Freier (1836), oil on wood, 0.63 x 0.486, Wien Museum
- Die Frau des Fischers am Meeresufer (1837), oil on wood, 0.395 x 0.485, Vienna, Österreichische Galerie Belvedere
- Der Augenarzt (1837), oil on canvas, 0.94 x 1.25, Wien Museum
- Die Klostersuppe (1838), oil on wood, 0.855 x 1.30, Vienna, Österreichische Galerie Belvedere
- Das Lotterielos (1838), oil on canvas, 0.885 x 0.71, Wien Museum
- Die Testamentseröffnung (1839), oil on wood, 0.95 x 1.19, Vienna, Österreichische Galerie Belvedere
- Der Pfennig der Witwe (1839), oil on canvas, 0.97 x 1.27, Salzbourg, Residenzgalerie
- Die Schachpartie (1839), oil on canvas, 1,35 x 1,75, Vienna, Österreichische Galerie Belvedere
- Die Mutterliebe (1839), oil on canvas, 0.507 x 0.42, Vienna, Österreichische Galerie Belvedere
- Wein, Weib und Gesang (1839), Vienna, Österreichische Galerie Belvedere
- Franz Liszt, am Flügel phantasierend ("Franz Liszt Fantasizing at the Piano") (1840), Berlin, Alte Nationalgalerie
- Porträt des Klavierfabrikanten Konrad Graf (1840), oil on wood, 0.82 x 0.63, Vienne, Österreichische Galerie Belvedere
- Die Zeitungsleser (1840), oil on wood, 0.21 x 0.17, Vienna, Österreichische Galerie Belvedere
- Die Frau vom Meer (1840), oil on wood, 0.51 x 0.39
- Der Astronom Karl Ludwig Edler von Littrow und Gattin Auguste geb. Bischoff (1841), oil on paperboard, 0.50 x 0.38, Wien Museum
- Die Hundekomödie (1841), oil on canvas, 0.603 x 0.658, Wien Museum
- Die Romanlektüre (1841), oil on canvas, 0.63 x 0.788, Munich, Galerie Grünwald
- Madame Lenormand weissagt der Kaiserin Josephine die Trennung von Napoleon (1841), oil on wood, 0.74 x 0.83, lost picture
- Das Kind und seine Welt (1842), oil on wood, 0.226 x 0.29, Wien Museum
- Die kleinen Virtuosen (1843), oil on paperboard, 0.40 x 0.365, Vienna, Österreichische Galerie Belvedere
- Das A-B-C (1843), oil on wood, 0.385 x 0.355, Wien Museum
- Die Brautwerbung (1844), oil on wood, 0.45 x 0.57, private collection
- Der Gottscheer Junge (1844), oil on wood, private collection
- Bildnis Franz von Schober (1844), oil on wood, 0.16 x 0.13, Wien Museum
- Die aufgehobene Zinspfändung (1844), oil on wood, 0.90 x 1.08, Linz, Oberösterreichischen Landesmuseen
- Die Dorfpolitiker (1844), oil on wood, 0.36 x 0.406, Vienna, City Galerie
- Das Stiegenweibchen (1845), oil on wood, 0.42 x 0.335, Vienna, Galerie Hassfurthe
- Franz Stelzhamer (1845), oil on canvas, 0.74 x 0.60, Linz, Oberösterreichischen Landesmuseen
- Franz Danhauser, der Bruder des Künstlers (1845), oil on paperboard, 0.343 x 0.272, Wien Museum
