= Liszt at the Piano =

Painting by Josef Danhauser

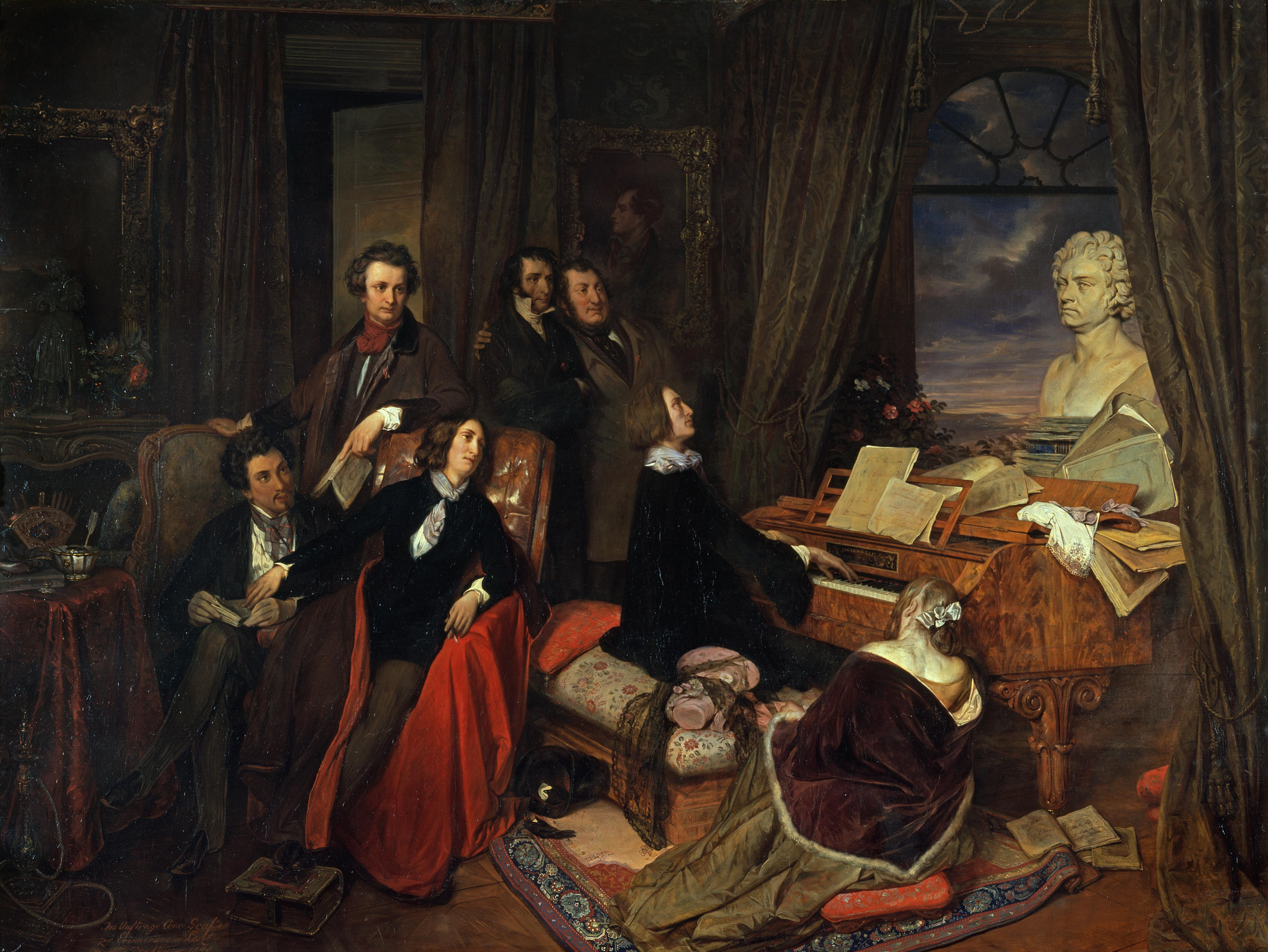
- Artist: Josef Danhauser
- Year: 1840
- Type: Oil on panel, conversation piece
- Dimensions: 122.5 cm × 165 cm (48.2 in × 65 in)
- Location: Alte Nationalgalerie, Berlin

Liszt at the Piano (German Liszt am Klavier) is an 1840 oil painting by the Austrian artist Josef Danhauser. A conversation piece, it depicts a group of celebrated figures of the Romantic era gathered in a Paris Salon listening to Franz Liszt performing at the piano. Included in the painting are Victor Hugo, Niccolò Paganini, Gioachino Rossini, Marie d'Agoult, George Sand and Alexandre Dumas.

What is also visible is a bust of Ludwig van Beethoven and a portrait of the British poet Lord Byron. The work was commissioned by the piano maker Conrad Graf. It was displayed at the 1841 art exhibition in Vienna. Today the painting is in the collection of the Alte Nationalgalerie in Berlin.

== Bibliography ==
- Comini, Alessandra. The Changing Image of Beethoven: A Study in Mythmaking. Sunstone Press, 2008.
- Hoppe, Christine, Kawabata, Maiko & Von Goldbeck, Melanie. Exploring Virtuosities: Heinrich Wilhelm Ernst, nineteenth-century musical practices and beyond. Georg Olms Verlagz, 2018.
