= The Pied Piper (1972 film) =

1972 American film by Jacques Demy

- Theatrical release poster
- Directed by: Jacques Demy
- Screenplay by: Mark Peploe; Andrew Birkin; Jacques Demy
- Produced by: Sanford Lieberson; David Puttnam
- Starring: Donovan; Jack Wild; Donald Pleasence; John Hurt
- Cinematography: Peter Suschitzky
- Edited by: John Trumper
- Music by: Donovan; Kenny Clayton
- Production companies: Sagittarius Productions Inc. Goodtimes Enterprises
- Distributed by: Paramount Pictures (United States); Scotia Barber Distributors (United Kingdom)
- Release date: 25 May 1972 (New York City)
- Running time: 90 minutes
- Countries: United States; United Kingdom
- Language: English
- Budget: $1.5 million

The Pied Piper (also known as Le Joueur de flûte) is a 1972 British musical fantasy film directed by Jacques Demy and starring Jack Wild, Donald Pleasence, John Hurt and Diana Dors, and featuring Donovan, who also composed music for the film. It was written by Mark Peploe, Andrew Birkin and Demy, loosely based on the legend of the Pied Piper.

== Plot ==
Germany, 1349. As the Black Death looms, the little town of Hamelin hires a pied piper to lure the rats away with his magic instrument. When the town refuses to pay, the Piper turns his power on their children.

== Cast ==
- Jack Wild as Gavin
- Donald Pleasence as The Baron
- John Hurt as Franz
- Donovan as The Piper
- Michael Hordern as Melius, alchemist
- Roy Kinnear as Burgermaster Poppendick
- Peter Vaughan as Bishop
- Diana Dors as Frau Poppendick
- Cathryn Harrison as Lisa
- Keith Buckley as Mattio, Gypsy leader
- Peter Eyre as pilgrim
- John Welsh as Chancellor
- Hamilton Dyce as Papal Nuncio
- Arthur Hewlett as Otto
- Sammie Winmill as Gretel
- André van Gyseghem as friar
- Roger Hammond as burger
- John Falconer as priest

== Reception ==
The Monthly Film Bulletin wrote: "The last thing one expects to say about a Demy film is that it lacks rhythm. In Lola, La Baie des Anges, the musical films and even the underrated Model Shop, rhythm has been Demy's motif – elegant transmutations of chance and destiny fashioned round the form of a rondo capriccioso. And if at times the device has seemed whimsical, the Demy charm has always been balanced by unstated but pervasive undercurrents of sadness: fate offers the disappointment of missed encounters as well as happy coincidences. In The Pied Piper, alas, all the encounters are missed and the only sadness is that Demy seems to have lost his masterly control of complex character manoeuvres. ... The film is bedevilled by its lack of focus. The camera glides, pans, tracks, but Demy seems so afraid of close-ups that with so many characters jostling for attention the central story and the title character get lost among the shifting paraphernalia of subsidiary themes and variations."

Variety wrote: "The Pied Piper, based on the 14th century legend from Hamelin, has been filmed by the sensitive Jacques Demy as a sort of somber fairy tale and allegory. The results are commendable in ambition but uneven in execution. Atop a cast of British film stalwarts, the David Puttnam-Sanford Lieberson production ... also stars one-name pop singer Donovan in the title role. His presence and musical score may enhance the potential. The domestic G rating can lure the family trade, but the Paramount release will strike many as a trifle heavy for its intended market. ... In recreating the story of the minstrel who leads the rats out of Hamelin, but then leads its children away when the politicians fail to keep a promise, the writers started with one of folklore's greatest pre-sold subjects. However, Andrew Birkin, Mark Peplos and Demy diffused the plot focus to the extent that the script seems more a series of broad, arch, low-comedy signettes without a clear emphasis."

Critic Tim Lucas wrote in Sight and Sound: "Photographed in pleasingly muted earth tones by Peter Suschitzky (now David Cronenberg's cameraman of choice), the film's almost complete reliance on long and medium shots (I noted exactly one close-up in the whole 90 minutes) and exclusive use of live, non-optical special effects give it the feel of a theatrical performance blessed with exceptional talent. ... Though it received an 'A' certificate in Britain and a 'G' rating in America, The Pied Piper is a remarkably kindred work to Ken Russell's X-rated The Devils (1971), being in its own way an exposé of historical connivings between political Church and pious State, meant to resonate with the anti-establishment tenor of its times which it still does. ... Here, too, a tribunal of priests in pointed cowls sentences a good man to be burned at the stake (To take medicine from a Jew, my lord, is to enter into a contract with Lucifer!") and, as said sentence is carried out, hundreds of rats burst forth from an oversized wedding cake in the likeness of the baron's projected cathedral – a moment whose symbolic overstatement Russell would doubtless approve."Sight and Sound wrote: "Piper"

On Rotten Tomatoes the film has a "rotten" approval rating of 44% based on reviews from 9 critics, with an average rating of 6.1/10.
