= La Démence du boxeur =

1992 novel by François Weyergans

- Author: François Weyergans
- Publisher: éditions Grasset
- Publication date: 1992
- ISBN: 978-2-246-44851-8

La Démence du boxeur is a Belgian novel by François Weyergans. It was first published in 1992 and won the Prix Renaudot in the same year.

== Editions ==
- La Démence du boxeur, éditions Grasset, 1992, ISBN 978-2246448518.
