= Trois jours chez ma mère =

Book by François Weyergans

- Author: François Weyergans
- Original title: Trois jours chez ma mère
- Language: French
- Publication date: 2005

Trois jours chez ma mère (transl. Three days with my mother) is a novel by Belgian author François Weyergans. It was first published in 2005 and won the Prix Goncourt, one of the most prestigious awards in France.

== See also ==
- 2005 in literature
- Belgian literature
