= Nélida =

Novel by Marie d'Agoult

Nélida is a novel by Marie d'Agoult, a "thinly disguised fictional account" of her affair with composer Franz Liszt that lasted from about 1834 to 1844, and a succès de scandale when first published in 1846. Marie later wrote several more novels as well as a distinguished history of the French Revolution of 1848.

The film 1975 Lisztomania was loosely based on director Ken Russell's interpretation of the novel.

== Plot summary ==
Nelida is a story about a beautiful, fragile woman who is based on Marie d'Agoult. When Nelida is young, she is fascinated by a man named Gummerman, who is based on Franz Liszt. Gummerman believes that art is a religion and he is passionate about it. When Nelida grows up, she meets Gummerman again. Gummerman is now a handsome young man who is driven by his passions. Nelida falls for him and they have a passionate kiss. Nelida then finds out that Gummerman is living with another woman. Depressed, Nelida marries whom she was engaged to, Timoleon, only to find out he bedded an Italian marquise. Seeing how heart broken Nelida is, Gummerman lives with her and falls in love with her. They go to different countries to perform. However, Gummerman seeks fame rather than art and in doing so, beds the Italian marquise. Nelida then breaks up with him. Realizing she failed, she dies in pity. Only then does Nelida come back to him.
