= Flesh Color =

1978 film by François Weyergans

- Directed by: François Weyergans
- Written by: François Weyergans
- Starring: Dennis Hopper; Veruschka von Lehndorff; Bianca Jagger; Jorge Donn; Laurent Terzieff; Anne Wiazemsky; Roger Blin; Lou Castel
- Cinematography: Ricardo Aronovich
- Edited by: Emmanuelle Castro; Dominique Martin; Sophie Tatischeff
- Music by: Friswa and Luc Hensill
- Release date: May 1978
- Running time: 116 mins
- Countries: France; Belgium; United States
- Languages: English, French

Flesh Color (French: Couleur Chair) is a 35 mm film by François Weyergans (Prix Goncourt 2005). Weyergans is one of the forty members known as immortals of the French Academy (L'Académie française). It features a band called Flesh Colour formed in 1976 in Brussels-Capital.

== Starring ==
- Dennis Hopper
- Veruschka von Lehndorff
- Bianca Jagger
- Jorge Donn
- Laurent Terzieff
- Anne Wiazemsky
- Roger Blin
- Lou Castel

== Presentation ==
This film was presented to the Cannes Film Festival in the parallel section in 1978.

The film was screened in 2022 at L'Étrange festivall in Paris.
