= Trick or Treat (unfinished film) =

- Directed by: Michael Apted
- Written by: Ray Connolly; Kathleen Tynan
- Based on: novel by Ray Connolly
- Produced by: David Puttnam; Sandy Lieberson
- Starring: Bianca Jagger; Jan Smithers; Nigel Davenport; Elsa Martinelli; Jan Smithers
- Production company: Goodtimes Enterprises
- Country: United Kingdom
- Language: English
- Budget: £600,000 (£400,000 of which was spent)

Trick or Treat is an unfinished British film directed by Michael Apted that began production in 1975. It led to the breakup of the producing partnership between David Puttnam and Sandy Lieberson.

== Premise ==
A lesbian couple who want a baby become involved with a married couple.

== Cast ==
- Bianca Jagger
- Nigel Davenport
- Elsa Martinelli
- Jan Smithers
- Carlo Puri

== Production ==
Ray Connolly first thought of the film's idea in 1969 and wrote it as a novel in 1974. He then turned it into a screenplay and succeeded in attracting the interest of David Puttnam of Goodtimes Enterprises. Regarding his idea for the film, Connolly said:

It was, in my mind, a love affair between four people, a sort of erotic Chabrol piece about sexual relationships and emotional ambivalences. It was to be set in Europe and to star three Europeans and one American. At a time when English films were unattractive outside Britain, here seemed an opportunity to make a film with international appeal. In fact I’d even gone to Paris to write the novel in the first place.

Production costs were obtained from the National Film Finance Corporation, EMI Films, and an Italian company called Rizzoli Film. Later, Playboy's film division contributed to the budget. Bianca Jagger and Stephanie Audran were cast as the leads; Audran later dropped out and was replaced by Elsa Martinelli.

The film's production commenced in 1975. Connolly says that Bianca Jagger was difficult to work with:

She wanted the script to be more faithful to the book, which was a surprising request since the book was much more sexually explicit than any of the scripts. During the next six months the question of the sex and nudity was to be a point for endless discussions between Bianca and the rest of us; we wanted to make a serious film about a sexual relationship between two women and a man. To us that involved nudity. In Bianca's mind there was some big bad film baron who wanted us to make a dirty film; that was absurd. Neither the producers nor the financiers ever put any pressure upon us to make a film other than the one we had always intended to make. Bianca never said she wouldn’t do the nudity – and even signed a contract to say that she would: she just moaned a lot about it. But then she moaned about most things … the costumes, the way the film was lit, the importance of having a say in approving the other girl and the eventual choices of the married couple... But most of all she moaned about the script.

Kathleen Tynan was called in to work on the script. Jagger refused to film nude scenes in Rome, claiming that the movie was "pure pornography".

The filming of the movie was eventually called off in January 1976. Connolly estimated that around £400,000 had been spent, leaving under forty minutes of usable footage.

== Impact ==
The result of the film contributed to the breakup of the partnership between David Puttnam and Sandy Lieberson. It also resulted in a number of lawsuits and was how Tynan met Puttnam and Apted; the three later made Agatha together.
