= Bianca Jagger =

Nicaraguan human rights advocate

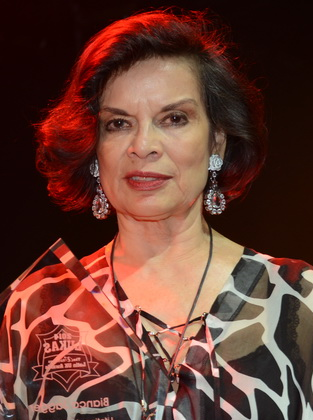
- Jagger in 2014
- Born: Blanca Pérez-Mora Macías; 2 May 1945 (age 81); Managua, Nicaragua
- Occupations: Actress; human rights advocate
- Spouse: Mick Jagger (m. 1971; div. 1978)
- Children: Jade Jagger

Bianca Jagger (born Blanca Pérez-Mora Macías; 2 May 1945) is a Nicaraguan social activist, human rights advocate, and a former actress. She gained international prominence in the 1970s through her marriage to Mick Jagger, the frontman of the Rolling Stones. Renowned for her influential style, Jagger was inducted into the International Best Dressed Hall of Fame in 1976.

A longtime activist, Jagger has been closely associated with human rights, environmental, and social justice causes. She currently serves as a Council of Europe goodwill ambassador, founder and chair of the Bianca Jagger Human Rights Foundation, member of the Executive Director's Leadership Council of Amnesty International USA, and a trustee of the Amazon Charitable Trust.

== Early life and education ==
Jagger was born in Managua, Nicaragua, on 2 May 1945. Her father was a successful import-export merchant and her mother a housewife. They divorced when Bianca was ten and she stayed with her mother, who had to take care of three children on a small income. At the age of 16, she changed her name from Blanca to Bianca. She received a scholarship to study political science in France at the Paris Institute of Political Studies. She was also influenced by Gandhi's non-violent success and Eastern philosophy at large. She travelled extensively in India.

== Film career ==
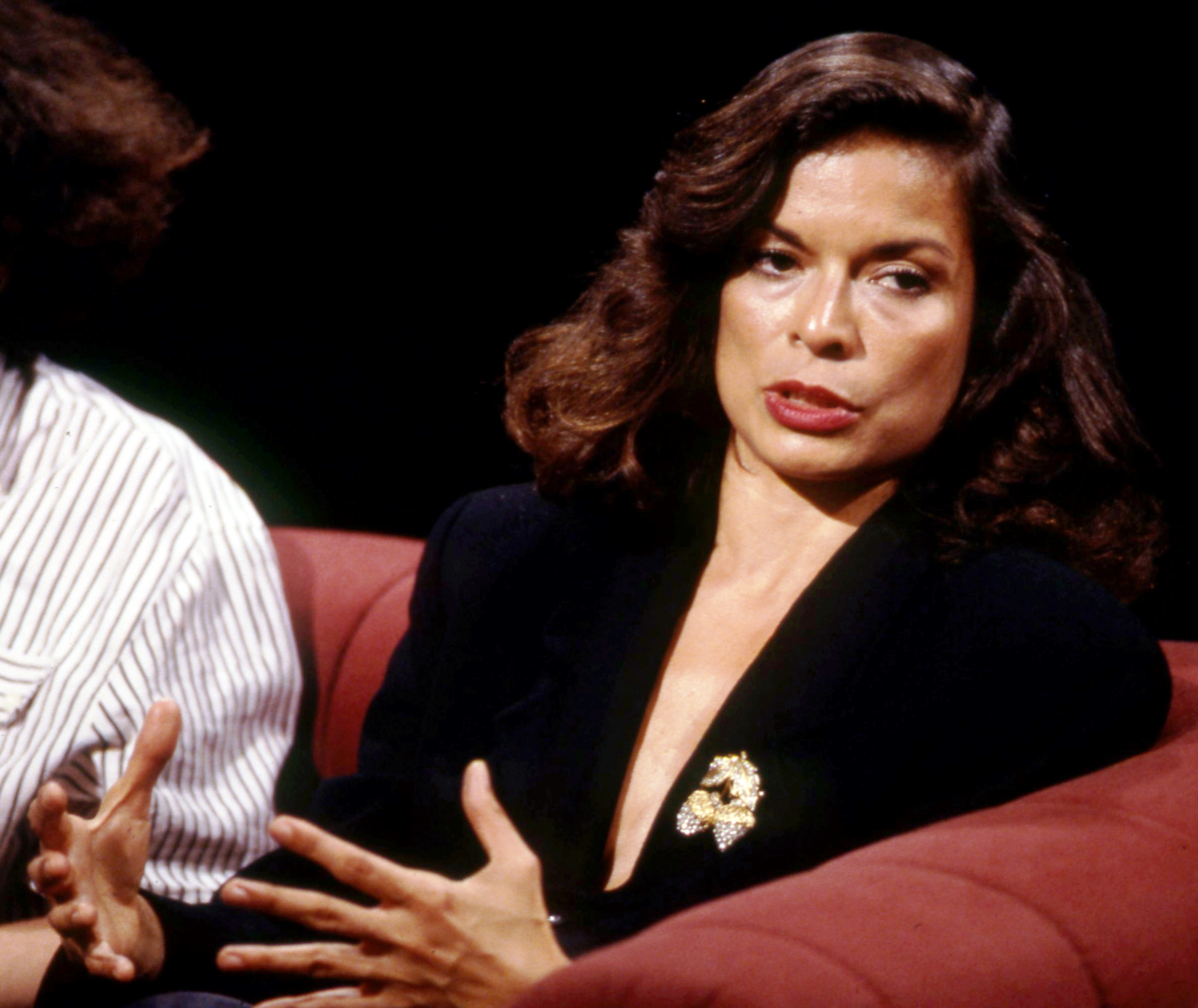
Jagger on the television programme After Dark, 1988

As her marriage to Mick Jagger deteriorated in the mid-1970s, Bianca Jagger sought to establish an independent professional identity and pursued acting. She made her screen debut alongside Dennis Hopper in Flesh Color (Couleur chair) (1978). That same year, she appeared as Martini in All You Need Is Cash (1978), a satirical television film featuring the Rutles, and expanded into American cinema with a supporting role as Corrine in The American Success Company (1980). She later appeared as the sheik's sister in the ensemble comedy The Cannonball Run (1981).

In the 1980s, Jagger continued acting in both film and television. She appeared in In Our Hands (1984) and made guest appearances on several television series, including Miami Vice (1985, episode "Free Verse"), Street Hawk (1985, episode "The Unsinkable 453"), Hotel (1986, episode "Separation"), and The Colbys (1987, episode "Betrayal"). By the late 1980's, Jagger largely withdrew from acting to focus on human rights advocacy and philanthropy.

== Activism ==
In 1981, Jagger was part of a US congressional delegation stationed at a UN refugee camp in Honduras. At one point during her official visit, the entire staff saw about 40 captured refugees marched away at gunpoint towards El Salvador by a death squad. Armed with nothing but cameras to document the raid, Jagger and the delegation trailed the squad along a river towards the Honduran-Salvadoran border. When both groups were within auditory range of each other, Jagger and the staff shouted at the M16 rifle-equipped raiders: "You will have to kill us all!" The squad considered the situation, approached the group, relieved them of their cameras, and released the cache of captives. A transformation had thus begun for Jagger. In subsequent interviews, Jagger has recounted this incident as "a turning point in my life".

Bianca Jagger founded the Bianca Jagger Human Rights Foundation, which she chairs. She returned to Nicaragua to look for her parents after the 1972 Nicaragua earthquake, which destroyed Managua, the capital, leaving a toll of more than 10,000 deaths and tens of thousands homeless.

In early 1979, Jagger visited Nicaragua with an International Red Cross delegation and was shocked by the brutality and oppression that the Somoza regime carried out there. This persuaded her to commit herself to the issues of justice and human rights.

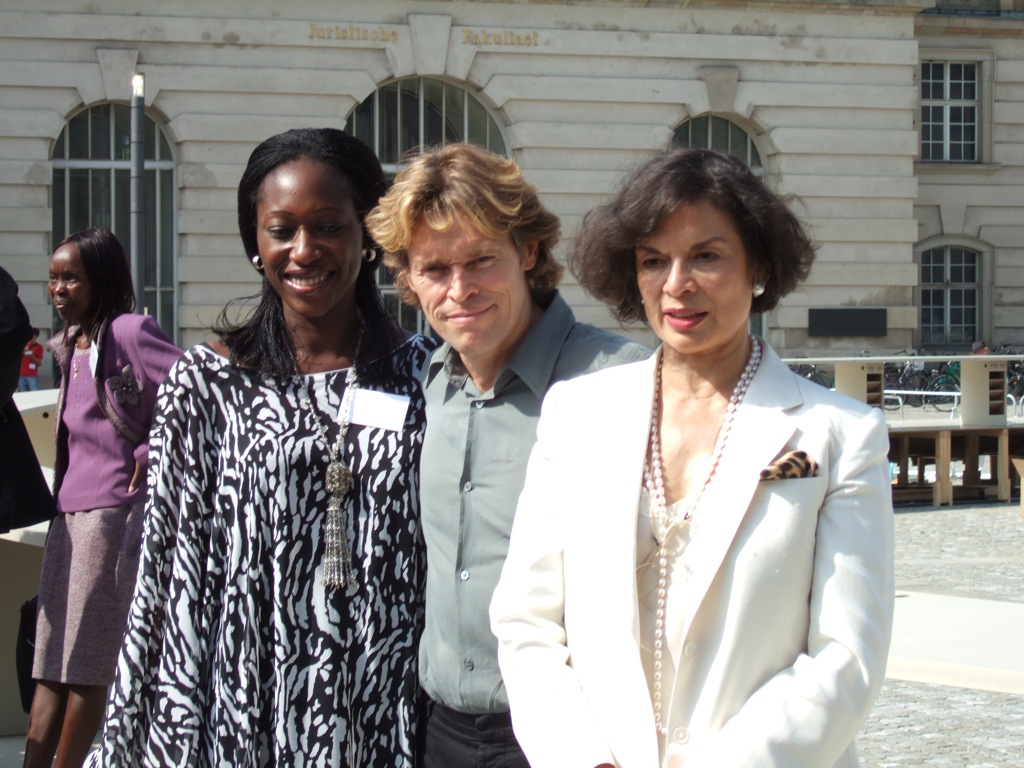
Jagger with Hafsat Abiola and Willem Dafoe at the Dropping Knowledge project's Table of Free Voices in Berlin, 2006

In the 1980s, she worked to oppose US government intervention in Nicaragua after the Sandinista revolution. She has also opposed the death penalty and defended the rights of women and of indigenous peoples in Latin America, notably the Yanomami tribe in Brazil against the invasion of gold miners. She spoke up for victims of the conflicts in Bosnia and Serbia. Her writings were published in several newspapers (including The New York Times and the Sunday Express). From the late 1970s, she collaborated with many humanitarian organisations including Amnesty International and Human Rights Watch.

She was also a member of the Twentieth Century Task Force to Apprehend War Criminals, and a trustee of the Amazon Charitable Trust. She gave a reading at the start of the memorial service in London's Westminster Cathedral, which was timed to coincide with the funeral in Brazil of Brazilian Jean Charles de Menezes, who was shot eight times on a tube-train after being mistaken for a suicide bomber in London. In March 2007, she became involved with Sarah Teather and the campaign to close Guantanamo Bay.

In March 2002, Jagger travelled to Afghanistan with a delegation of fourteen women, organised by Global Exchange to support Afghan women's projects. On 16 December 2003, Jagger was nominated Council of Europe Goodwill Ambassador.

From 2007 to 2009, she was chair of the World Future Council. On 7 July 2007, Jagger presented at the German leg of Live Earth in Hamburg. In July 2008, she was a signatory to a petition to the Catholic bishops of England and Wales to allow the wider celebration of the traditional Latin Mass. In January 2009, Jagger addressed some 12,000 people who rallied in Trafalgar Square in protest against an Israeli offensive in the Gaza several days earlier.

She is a "messenger", more accurately termed ambassador, for the environmental organisation 350.org.

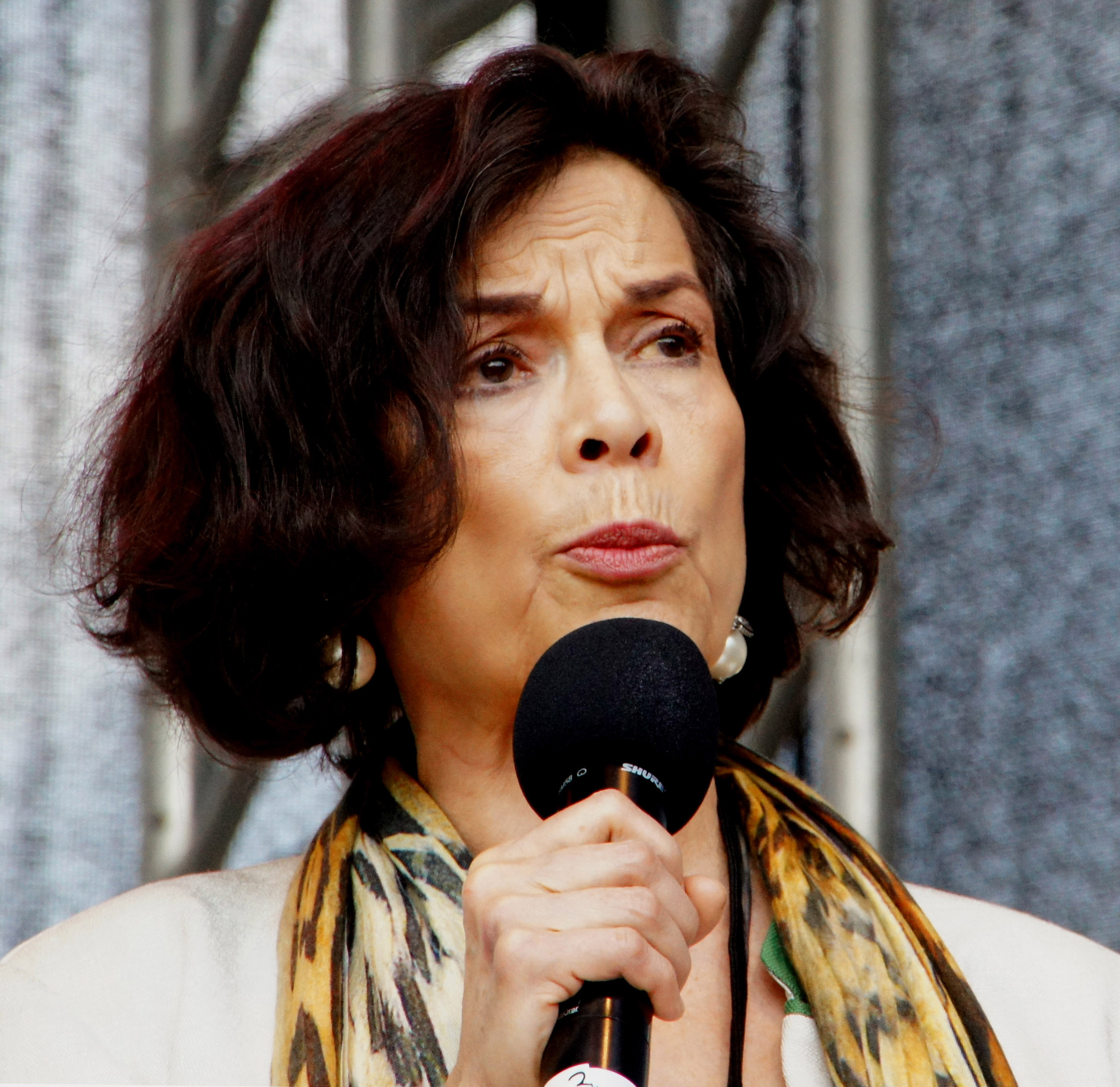
Jagger engaging for human rights in Tibet, Vienna, 2012

She has served as IUCN's Global Ambassador for the Bonn Challenge, a global effort to restore 150 million hectares of the world's degraded and deforested lands by 2020.

On 8 October 2010, she spoke at the Association for the Study of Peak Oil and Gas (ASPO) 2010 world conference on moving beyond petroleum and "Crimes against Present and Future Generations".

In June 2012, along with the International Union for Conservation of Nature and Airbus, Jagger launched an online campaign called the Plant a Pledge initiative, which aims to restore 150 million hectares of forest around the world by 2020.

On 21 November 2013, Jagger delivered the prestigious 12th annual Longford Lecture titled "Ending Violence Against Women and Girls, and the Culture of Impunity: achieving the missing Millennium Development Goal target", chaired by Jon Snow.

Prior to the 2015 UK general election, she was one of several celebrities who endorsed the parliamentary candidacy of the Green Party's Caroline Lucas.

== Personal life ==
Jagger has dual nationality, as a naturalised British citizen and a citizen of Nicaragua.

Jagger had a public reputation as a jet-setter and party-goer in the 1970s and early 1980s, being closely associated in the public mind with New York City's nightclub Studio 54. She was famously photographed on a horse at Studio 54 on her 32nd birthday in 1977.

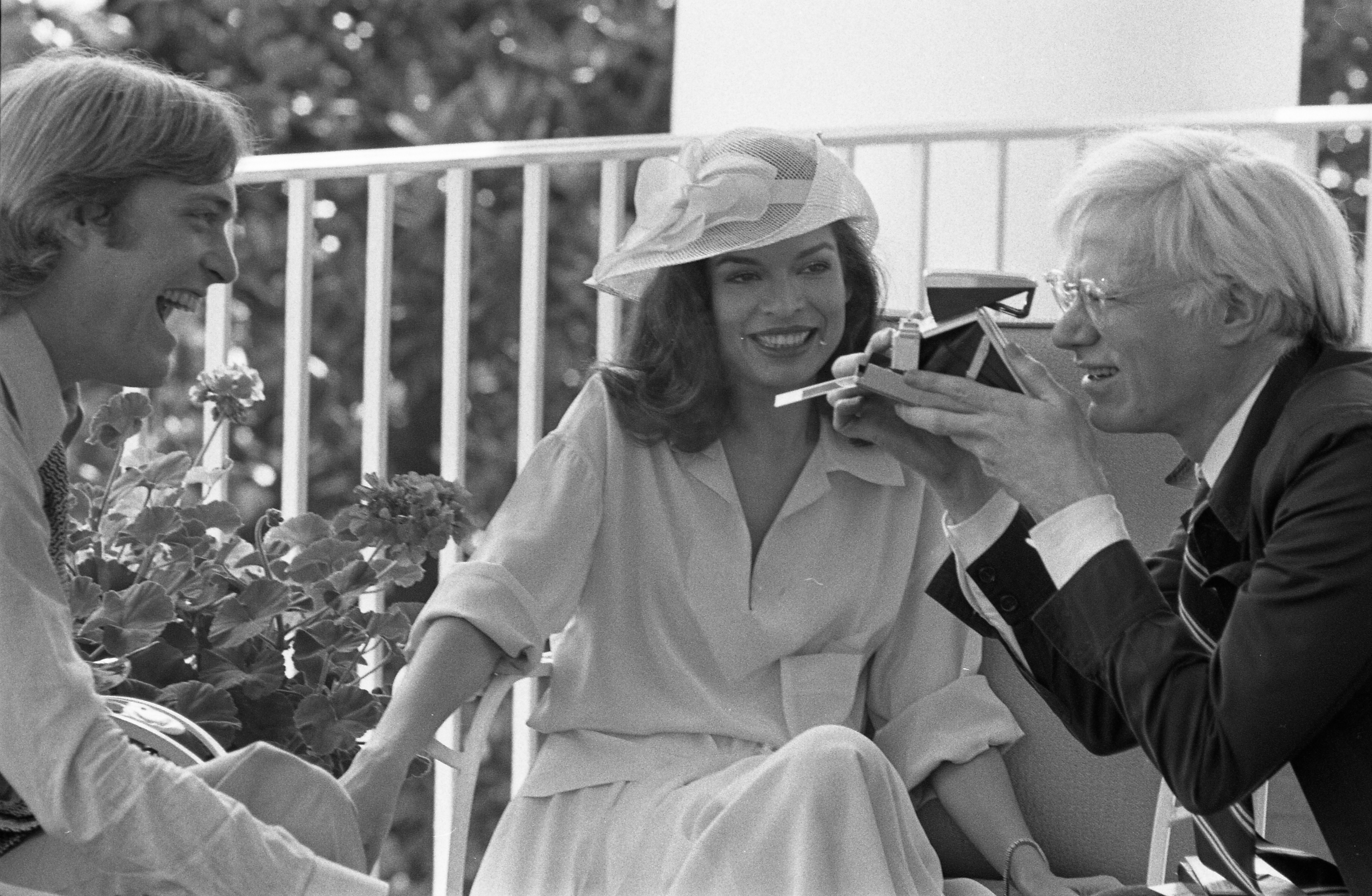
Jagger with Jack Ford and Andy Warhol seated on the Truman Balcony at the White House, 1975

Jagger also became known for her friendship with pop artist Andy Warhol. In his 1979 book Exposures, Warhol said, "Bianca Jagger is one of the most Socially Diseased people I know. She's almost as bad as me—and I'm terminal. She loves to go out every night to the hottest spot in town and make a big dramatic entrance in a big dramatic dress." During the summer, Jagger rented the main cottage at Warhol's estate Eothen in Montauk, New York. She frequently appeared on the cover of his Interview magazine, and they interviewed President Gerald Ford's son Jack Ford at the White House in Washington, D.C. in 1975. She also interviewed Steven Spielberg, Calvin Klein, and Yves Saint Laurent.

Jagger caused a minor controversy in May 2012 when she took flash photographs during a performance of Philip Glass's Einstein on the Beach at the Barbican in London.

=== Relationships and marriages ===
In the late 1960s, Bianca Jagger dated actor Michael Caine. They met in France, and she moved to England with him. Jagger later told People magazine in 1977 that "Caine was unkind, superficial, and kept me like I was his geisha," while Caine described Jagger as "one of the most intelligent girls in town." She left him for French record executive Eddie Barclay, whom she ultimately refused to marry because he had already been divorced.

Bianca Jagger met Mick Jagger at a party after a Rolling Stones concert in France in September 1970. On 12 May 1971, while she was four months pregnant, the couple married in a Roman Catholic ceremony in Saint-Tropez, France, and she became his first and only wife of a legal marriage. The couple's only child, a daughter named Jade, was born on 21 October 1971, in Paris, France. In May 1978, Bianca Jagger filed for divorce on the grounds of his adultery. Reflecting on the early years of her marriage, she said, "I played the wife. I was docile and subservient … but groupies weren't an easy thing to get used to. Mick is in some ways misogynist, because there are too many women available to him." Although she was frequently photographed by paparazzi with male companions, she maintained that—aside from an off-and-on two-year affair with Ryan O'Neal—those encounters were never consummated.

Jagger has two granddaughters from her daughter Jade: Assisi Lola (born in 1992) and Amba Isis (born in 1996), and a grandson born in 2014. She became a great-grandmother in 2014 through her granddaughter Assisi.

== Awards ==
For her international work on behalf of humanitarian causes, Jagger has earned numerous awards, including:

- 1983 Honorary Doctorate of Humanities degree from Stonehill College in Massachusetts
- 1994 United Nations Earth Day award
- 1996 Hispanic Federation of New York City's Humanitarian Award
- 1996 Woman of the Year Title from the Boys Town of Italy
- 1996 Abolitionist of the Year Award from the National Coalition to Abolish the Death Penalty
- 1997 Green Globe Award from the Rainforest Alliance
- 1997 Amnesty International USA Media Spotlight Award for Leadership
- 1997 Inducted to the Hall of Fame in Miami Children's Hospital Foundation
- 1998 American Civil Liberties Union Award
- 2000 Champion of Justice Award
- 2003 International Award from International Service
- 2003 'special recognition' as a Woman of Peace at the Global Exchange Human Rights Awards in San Francisco with Arundhati Roy, Barbara Lee and Kathy Kelly.
- 2004 Women's World Award (World Achievement) from Mikhail Gorbachev
- 2004 Right Livelihood Award
- 2006 World Citizenship Award from The Nuclear Age Peace Foundation
- 2006 Office of the Americas Peace and Justice Award
- 2008 Honorary Doctorate of Human Rights degree from Simmons College in Massachusetts

== Film and television ==
Bianca also appeared in several movies and TV shows:

- Cocksucker Blues (1972, documentary about the Rolling Stones' 1972 North American tour)
- Trick or Treat (1975) (unfinished movie)
- Flesh Color (Couleur chair) (1978)
- All You Need Is Cash (1978, as Martini)
- The American Success Company (1980; as Corrine)
- The Cannonball Run (1981, as sheik's sister)
- In Our Hands (1984)
- Miami Vice (1985) TV episode "Free Verse"
- Street Hawk (1985) TV episode "The Unsinkable 453"
- Hotel (1986) TV episode "Separation"
- The Colbys (1987) TV episode "Betrayal"
- After Dark (an extended appearance in 1988 on the British TV programme, discussed here).
- C.H.U.D. II: Bud the C.H.U.D. (1989)
- Last Party 2000 (2001, a documentary film about the 2000 US Presidential election)
- The Fourth Revolution: Energy (2011 German documentary)
