= Macaire le Copte =

Macaire le Copte is a novel by François Weyergans. It was first published in Paris in 1981 by Gallimard. This book won the Prix Victor-Rossel in 1981 and the Prix des Deux Magots in 1982. The story is set in fourth century Egypt.

== Editions ==
- Macaire le Copte, éditions Gallimard, 1981 ISBN 207026470X.

== Bibliography ==
- French XX Bibliography, issue 38, volume 8, p 8726
- Pascal Ruffenach, "Des bords du désert jusqu'à son centre" (1981) Quinzaine littéraire, issue 358, p 9 Google Books
- Bulletin critique du livre français, 1982 issues 433-438, page 117426 Google Books
- Francois Nourissier, "Weyergans, une nouvelle métamorphose" (1981) Le Figaro Magazine, issue 139, p 52 Google Books
- (1982) 56 World Literature Today 646 Google Books
