= Marie d'Agoult =

Franco-German romantic author and historian (1805–1876)

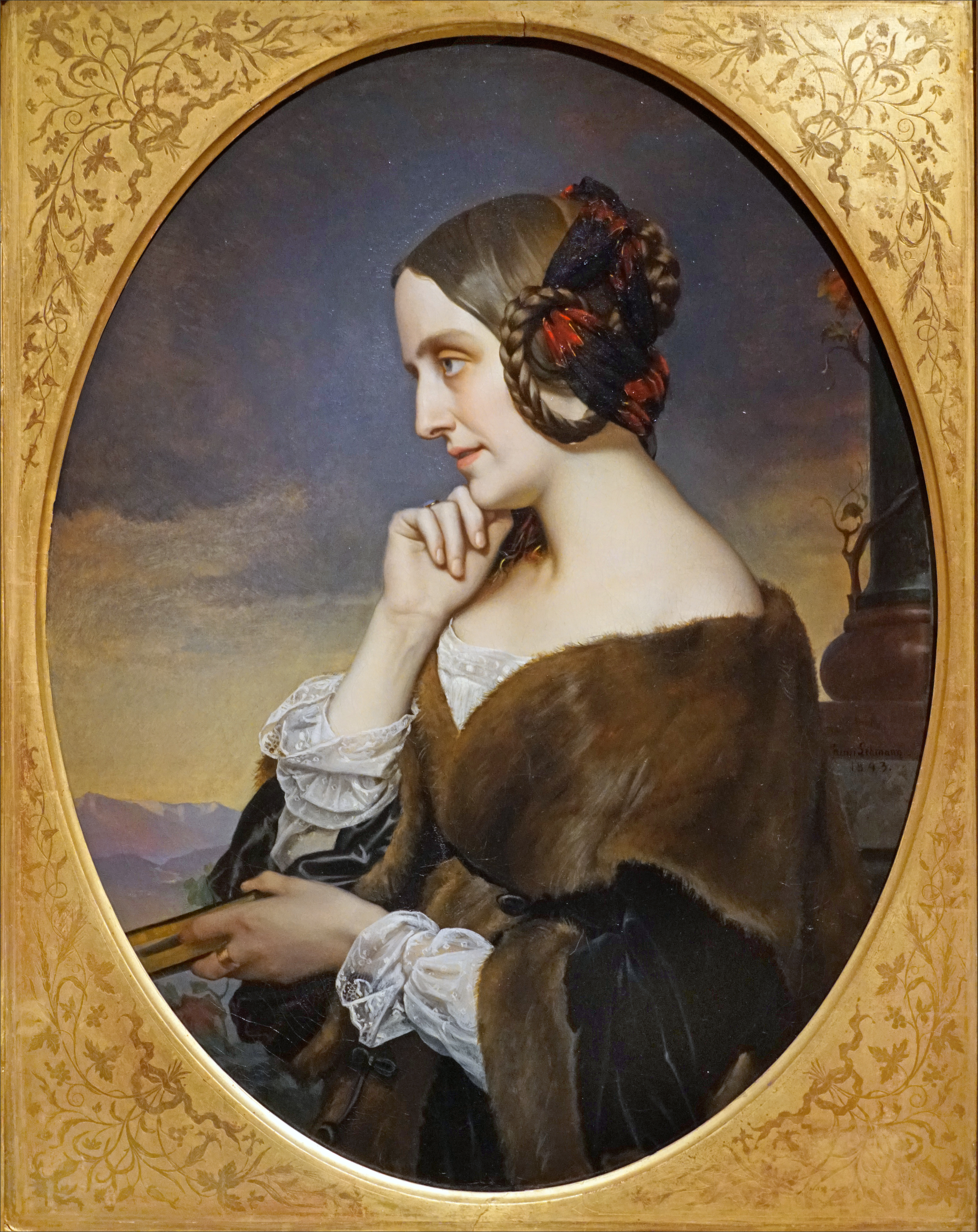
- Marie d'Agoult (1843), painting by Henri Lehmann
- Born: Marie Catherine Sophie de Flavigny; 31 December 1805; Frankfurt am Main, Holy Roman Empire
- Died: 5 May 1876 (aged 70); Paris, France
- Resting place: Père Lachaise Cemetery
- Spouse(s): Charles Louis Constant d'Agoult, Comte d'Agoult (m. 1827; sep. 1835)
- Partner: Franz Liszt (1835–1839)
- Children: 5, including Cosima
- Writing career
- Pen name: Daniel Stern

Marie Catherine Sophie, Comtesse d'Agoult (born de Flavigny; 31 December 1805 – 5 March 1876), was a French romantic author and historian, known also by her pen name, Daniel Stern.

== Life ==
=== Early life ===
Marie d'Agoult was born in Frankfurt am Main, Germany, with the full name of Marie Catherine Sophie de Flavigny, the daughter of Alexandre Victor François, Vicomte de Flavigny (1770–1819), an émigré French aristocrat, and his wife Maria Elisabeth Bethmann (1772–1847), whose father was the German merchant and banker Johann Philipp Bethmann (1715–1793).

She entered into an early marriage of convenience with Charles Louis Constant d'Agoult, Comte d'Agoult (1790–1875) on 16 May 1827, thereby becoming the Comtesse d'Agoult. They had two daughters, Louise (1828–1834) and Claire (1830–1912). Marie never divorced the count, even though she had left him for Franz Liszt.

=== Franz Liszt ===
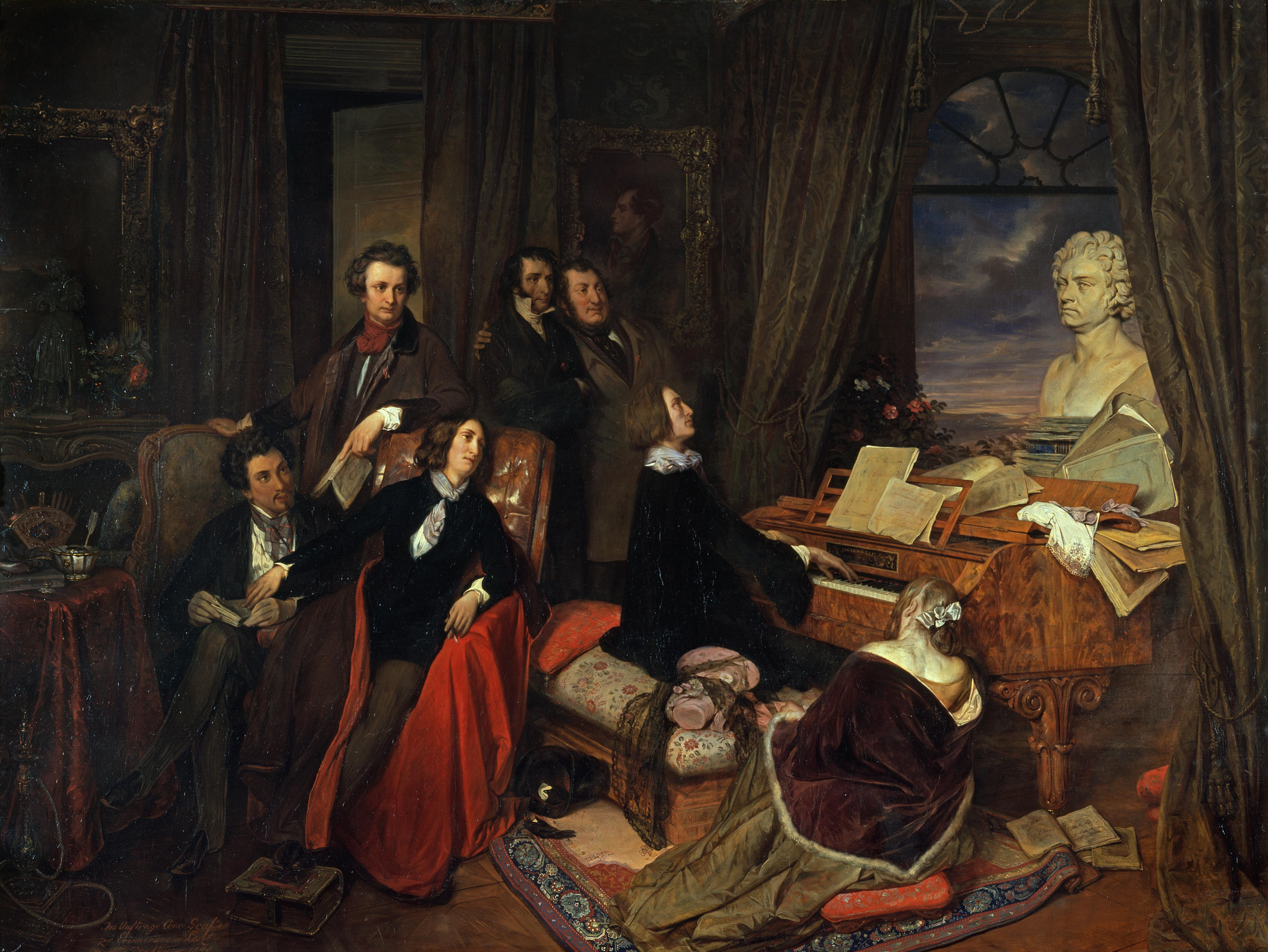
Liszt at the Piano by Josef Danhauser, 1840.

From 1835 to 1839, she lived with composer and virtuoso pianist Franz Liszt, who was six years younger, and was then a rising concert star. Liszt dedicated “Die Lorelei", one of his very first pieces to her.

From 1837 to 1839 the two traveled to Italy and Switzerland, staying successively in Bellagio, Milan, Venice, Lugano, Modena, Florence, Bologna and Rome. During these travels, she became close to Liszt's circle of friends, including Frédéric Chopin, who dedicated his 12 Études, Op. 25 to her, and George Sand.

D’Agoult's relationship with Sand began as friendship, with Sand acting as a mentor for the less experienced D’Agoult, but soured over the years amid rumors of jealousy and ended in mutual animosity. Sand's account of this period became the inspiration for Honoré de Balzac’s novel, Béatrix.

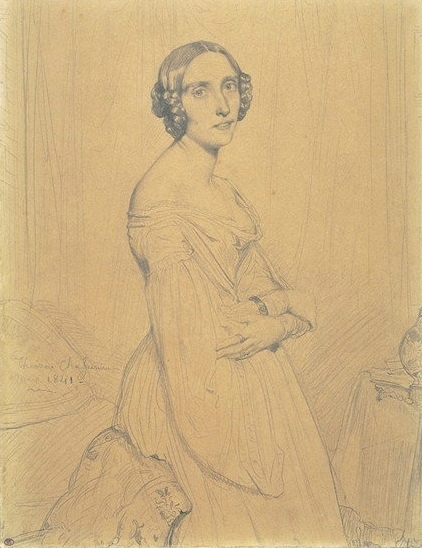
Portrait of d'Agoult by Théodore Chassériau (Musée du Louvre)

D'Agoult had three children with Liszt; however, she and Liszt did not marry, maintaining their independent views and other differences while Liszt was busy composing and touring throughout Europe. After their breakup in 1844, Liszt assumed full custody of their three children and refused D’Agoult any visitation rights.

Her children with Liszt were:

- Blandine Rachel (1835–1862), who was the first wife of future French prime minister Émile Ollivier and died at the age of 26
- Francesca Gaetana Cosima (1837–1930), who first married pianist and conductor Hans von Bülow and then composer Richard Wagner
- Daniel (1839–1859), who was already a promising pianist and gifted scholar when he died of tuberculosis.

=== Later life ===
Following her split with Liszt, D'Agoult resurrected her Paris salon first in Geneva with attendees such as Jean Charles Léonard de Sismondi, Germaine de Staël, Adolphe Pictet, and then in Paris. This salon eventually became a meeting place for democratic opposition to Napoleon III and his authoritarian rule following his coup d'état in 1851.

In 1876, she died in Paris, aged 70, and was buried in Division 54 of Père Lachaise Cemetery.

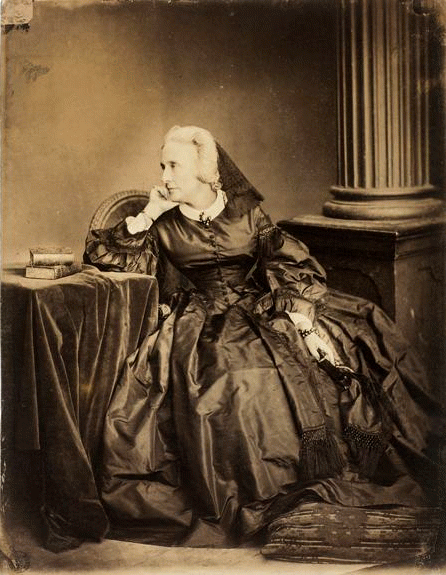
d'Agoult in 1861. Photo by Adam-Salomon.

- Her first stories (Hervé, Julien, and Valentia), published 1841–1845
- Histoire de la révolution de 1848 (appearing from 1850 to 1853, in 3 volumes), her best known work published under the name Daniel Stern
- Nélida, a novel (1846)
- Lettres Républicaines in Esquisses morales et politiques (1849, collected articles)
- Trois journées de la vie de Marie Stuart (1856)
- Florence et Turin (1862)
- Histoire des commencements de la république aux Pays-Bas (1872)
- A Catholic Mother Speaks to Her Children (1906, posthumously)
- Mes souvenirs (1877, posthumously).
- Correspondence with Liszt
- Mémoires, souvenirs et journaux de la Comtesse d'Agoult, Mercure de France, Paris, 1990.
