= Goodtimes Enterprises =

British film production company (formed 1968)

Goodtimes Enterprises was a British film production company, run by David Puttnam and Sanford Lieberson. Their films include Performance, Melody, That'll Be The Day, Stardust, Mahler, Lisztomania and Bugsy Malone. The company was formed by Lieberson in 1968 with Performance, and Puttnam joined the company as a partner in 1970. They also owned a small independent British film distribution company called Visual Programme Systems, (or VPS), which would sometimes produce and release documentaries such as Brother, Can You Spare A Dime?

== Selected filmography ==
- Performance (1970)
- Melody (1971)
- Dougal and the Blue Cat (1972)
- Bringing It All Back Home (1972)
- The Pied Piper (1972)
- That'll Be the Day (1973)
- The Final Programme (1973)
- Mahler (1974)
- Stardust (1974)
- Slade in Flame (1975)
- Lisztomania (1975)
- Bugsy Malone (1976)
