= François Weyergans =

Belgian writer and director (1941–2019)

- Born: 2 August 1941; Etterbeek, Belgium
- Died: 27 May 2019 (aged 77); Paris, France
- Occupations: Writer; Film director
- Known for: Member of the Académie française

François Weyergans (French: [fʁɑ̃swa vɛjɛʁɡɑ̃s]; 2 August 1941 – 27 May 2019) was a Belgian writer and director. His father, Franz Weyergans, was a Belgian and also a writer, while his mother was from Avignon in France. François Weyergans was elected to the Académie française on 26 March 2009, taking the 32nd seat which became vacant with the death of Alain Robbe-Grillet in 2008.

== Biography ==
He started film studies at the IDHEC (Hautes Études Cinématographiques), where he came to love the films of Robert Bresson and Jean-Luc Godard, among others. He soon began to write for Cahiers du cinéma and directed his first film in 1961, on Maurice Béjart, which led to his expulsion from the school as students were banned from making professional films.

== Novels ==
After having been through some psychoanalysis, he published a satirical account of his treatment in a novel called Le Pitre (1971), which attracted some critical notice and won the Roger Nimier Prize. His second novel in 1981 was Macaire le Copte. This won the Prix Rossel in his native Belgium, as well as the Prix des Deux Magots in France. From then on, Weyergans devoted himself entirely to writing, spending whole nights working from 11 p.m. until noon. His subsequent works—mostly of an ironic autobiographical nature—also won literary prizes, including the "Prix Méridien des quatre jurys" in 1983 for Le radeau de la Méduse and the Prix Renaudot in 1992 for La démence du boxeur. Most recently, his Trois jours chez ma mère awarded him the Prix Goncourt in 2005. In this, he satirises his own famous difficulties in delivering a promised manuscript in time. In the process he creates a "Russian doll" type structure where he (Weyergans) writes as a writer, Weyergraf, who finds all sorts of distractions or reasons to avoid writing a book called Trois jours chez ma mère. He does this largely by inventing an author called Graffenberg, who in turn invents another author, Weyerstein, who sketches out a possible structure—but he keeps getting waylaid by humorous meditations on his own life, love (or just encounters), family, films and multiple enthusiasms and interests.

== Films ==
- 1962: Béjart
- 1963: Hieronymus Bosch
- 1965: Robert Bresson: Ni vu, ni connu (des portraits Cinéastes de notre temps), 65 minutes
- 1967: Baudelaire is gestorven in de zomer
- 1967: Aline
- 1972: Un film sur quelqu'un
- 1977: Maladie mortelle
- 1977: Je t'aime, tu danses
- 1978: Couleur Chair (Flesh Color)
