= Sanford Lieberson =

American film producer (born 1936)

Sandy Lieberson
- Born: Sandford Lieberson; 16 July 1936 (age 89); Los Angeles, California, U.S.
- Occupations: Film producer; educator
- Known for: Founder of Goodtimes Enterprises; Umbrella Entertainment

Sanford "Sandy" Lieberson (born 16 July 1936) is an American film producer and educator based in Britain since 1965.

== Biography ==
Born on 16 July 1936 in Los Angeles, California, Sandy Lieberson began his career as an agent in the US, at the William Morris Agency with clients who included Sergio Leone, Peter Sellers, Richard Harris and The Rolling Stones. He worked in Rome for almost three years from 1961, then returned to the US for two years, before moving to the UK in 1965, going on to become a film producer. In 1968 he founded the British production company Goodtimes Enterprises, which produced films such as Performance (1970), Mahler (1974), and Lisztomania (1975). David Puttnam became a partner of Goodtimes in 1970.

Since the mid-1970s, Lieberson formed a new production company called Umbrella Entertainment, which produced films such as Jabberwocky (1977) and Rita, Sue and Bob Too (1987). Between 1977 and 1980, he held various positions at 20th Century Fox, and was subsequently Vice President of International Production for The Ladd Company, before becoming Chief of Production at Goldcrest Films between 1984 and 1986. He was also head of production for UK 20th Century Fox and MGM, and was the inaugural Chair of Film London from 2003, continuing to help shape it for eight years. He set up the Producers course at the National Film and Television School and was Head Tutor of its Producing Department.

== Awards ==
Lieberson received the BIFA (British Independent Film Awards) Special Jury Prize in 2005. In 2012, he was appointed an honorary CBE in recognition of his services to the film industry.

== Selected credits ==
- Performance (1970)
- Glastonbury Fayre (1971)
- The Pied Piper (1972)
- The Final Programme (1973)
- That'll Be the Day (1973)
- Stardust (1974)
- Trick or Treat (1975)
- Lisztomania (1975)
- Jabberwocky (1977)
