= Cinecom =

American film company

Cinecom International Films
- Industry: Independent film production and distribution
- Founded: 1982; 44 years ago
- Defunct: 1991; 35 years ago
- Fate: Bankruptcy; library purchased by Crédit Lyonnais
- Headquarters: New York City
- Key people: Founders Ira Deutchman, Amir Malin and John Ives

Cinecom Pictures was an independent film company founded in 1982 by Ira Deutchman (a former member of United Artists Classics), Amir Malin and John Ives. Its first release was Robert Altman's Come Back to the Five and Dime, Jimmy Dean, Jimmy Dean.

The company also distributed The Brother from Another Planet and Salaam Bombay!. Its highest-grossing release was 1985's A Room with a View. Cinecom closed operations in 1991 after it filed for bankruptcy; Crédit Lyonnais acquired the company's film library the following year, licensing worldwide distribution rights to the library to October Films. Although the Cinecom library was acquired by MGM Studios, who purchased Crédit Lyonnais' film library from PolyGram Filmed Entertainment in 1999, much of its films have since been acquired by third parties.

== Films released ==
- 1982: Come Back to the Five and Dime, Jimmy Dean Jimmy Dean (Robert Altman) (owned by Paramount Pictures)
- 1982: Starstruck (Gillian Armstrong) (owned by Shout! Studios via Westchester Films)
- 1983: Angelo My Love (Robert Duvall)
- 1983: City News (David Fishelson) (owned by PBS)
- 1983: El Norte (Gregory Nava) (owned by Independent Productions; distribution rights licensed to Lionsgate, Janus Films and The Criterion Collection)
- 1983: L'Argent (Robert Bresson) (owned by mk2; distribution rights licensed to Janus Films and the Criterion Collection)
- 1983: Monkey Grip (Ken Cameron) (owned by Umbrella Entertainment)
- 1984: 1918 (Ken Harrison) (owned by Shout! Studios via Westchester Films)
- 1984: Boy Meets Girl (Leos Carax) (distribution rights owned by Kino Lorber, the Criterion Collection and Carlotta Films US)
- 1984: The Brother From Another Planet (John Sayles) (owned by the Independent Film Company)
- 1984: Burroughs (Howard Brookner) (owned by Pinball London; distribution rights licensed to Janus Films and the Criterion Collection)
- 1984: Cold Feet (Bruce van Dusen)
- 1984: Last Night at the Alamo (Eagle Pennell) (owned by the Independent Film Company)
- 1984: Metropolis (Fritz Lang) (distribution rights owned by Kino Lorber)
- 1984: Secret Honor (Robert Altman) (owned by Sandcastle 5)
- 1984: Stop Making Sense (Jonathan Demme) (owned by A24)
- 1984: The Revolt of Job (Imre Gyongyossy and Barna Kabay) (owned by Focus Features)
- 1984: The Times of Harvey Milk (Robert Epstein) (owned by Telling Pictures; distribution rights licensed to Janus Films and the Criterion Collection)
- 1985: The Coca-Cola Kid (Dusan Makavejev)
- 1985: Latino (Haskell Wexler)
- 1985: Pumping Iron 2 (George Butler)
- 1985: Let Ye Inherit (Imre Gyongyossy, Barna Kabay, atalin Petenyi)
- 1985: A Marriage (Sandy Tung)
- 1985: A Thousand Little Kisses (Mira Recanati)
- 1985: Tom Goes to the Bar (Dean Prisot) (owned by Dean Prisot)
- 1986: 90 Days (Giles Walker)
- 1986: Arthur's Hallowed Ground (Freddie Young) (owned by Film4 Productions and Goldcrest Films)
- 1986: Fast Talking (Ken Cameron) (owned by Umbrella Entertainment)
- 1986: Forever Young (David Drury) (owned by Film4 Productions and Goldcrest Films)
- 1986: Home of the Brave (Laurie Anderson) (owned by Rhino Entertainment)
- 1986: Menage (Bertrand Blier)
- 1986: Native Son (Jerrold Freeman) (owned by Warner Bros.)
- 1986: Parting Glances (Bill Sherwood) (owned by First Run Features)
- 1986: A Room With A View (James Ivory) (owned by Shout! Studios via Westchester Films)
- 1986: Sharma and Beyond (Brian Gilbert) (owned by Film4 Productions and Goldcrest Films)
- 1986: Tea in the Harem (Mehdi Charef)
- 1986: Those Glory Glory Days (Philip Saville) (owned by Film4 Productions and Goldcrest Films)
- 1986: Winter Flight (Roy Battersby) (owned by Film4 Productions and Goldcrest Films)
- 1987: Comic Magazine (Yōjirō Takita)
- 1987: Julia and Julia (Peter Del Monte)
- 1987: The Lighthorsemen (Simon Wincer) (owned by Umbrella Entertainment)
- 1987: A Man in Love (Diane Kurys) (owned by Pathé)
- 1987: Matewan (John Sayles)
- 1987: Maurice (James Ivory) (owned by Cohen Media Group)
- 1987: Sammy and Rosie Get Laid (Stephen Frears)
- 1987: Swimming to Cambodia (Jonathan Demme)
- 1988: Comic Book Confidential (Ron Mann) (owned by Films We Like)
- 1988: The Deceivers (Nicholas Meyer) (owned by Cohen Media Group)
- 1988: Miles from Home (Gary Sinise)
- 1988: Salaam Bombay (Mira Nair) (co-owned by the BFI)
- 1989: Brightness (Souleymane Cissé) (owned by Kino Lorber)
- 1989: Last Exit to Brooklyn (Uli Edel) (owned by Constantin Film; distribution rights licensed to Samuel Goldwyn Films)
- 1989: Queen of Hearts (Jon Amiel)
- 1989: Scenes from the Class Struggle in Beverly Hills (Paul Bartel)
- 1989: Trust Me (Robert Houston)
- 1989: We Think the World of You (Colin Gregg) (owned by California Pictures)
- 1990: The Handmaid's Tale (Volker Schlondorff)
- 1990: Rosencrantz & Guildenstern Are Dead (Tom Stoppard) (owned by RLJE Films)
- 1990: Tune in Tomorrow (Jon Amiel)
- 1991: Mississippi Masala (Mira Nair) (owned by Mirabai Films; distribution rights licensed to Janus Films and the Criterion Collection)
- 1991: Once Around (Lasse Hallström) (owned by Universal Pictures)
