= David Puttnam =

British film producer (born 1941)

The Right Honourable The Lord Puttnam CBE HonFRSA HonFRPS MRIA
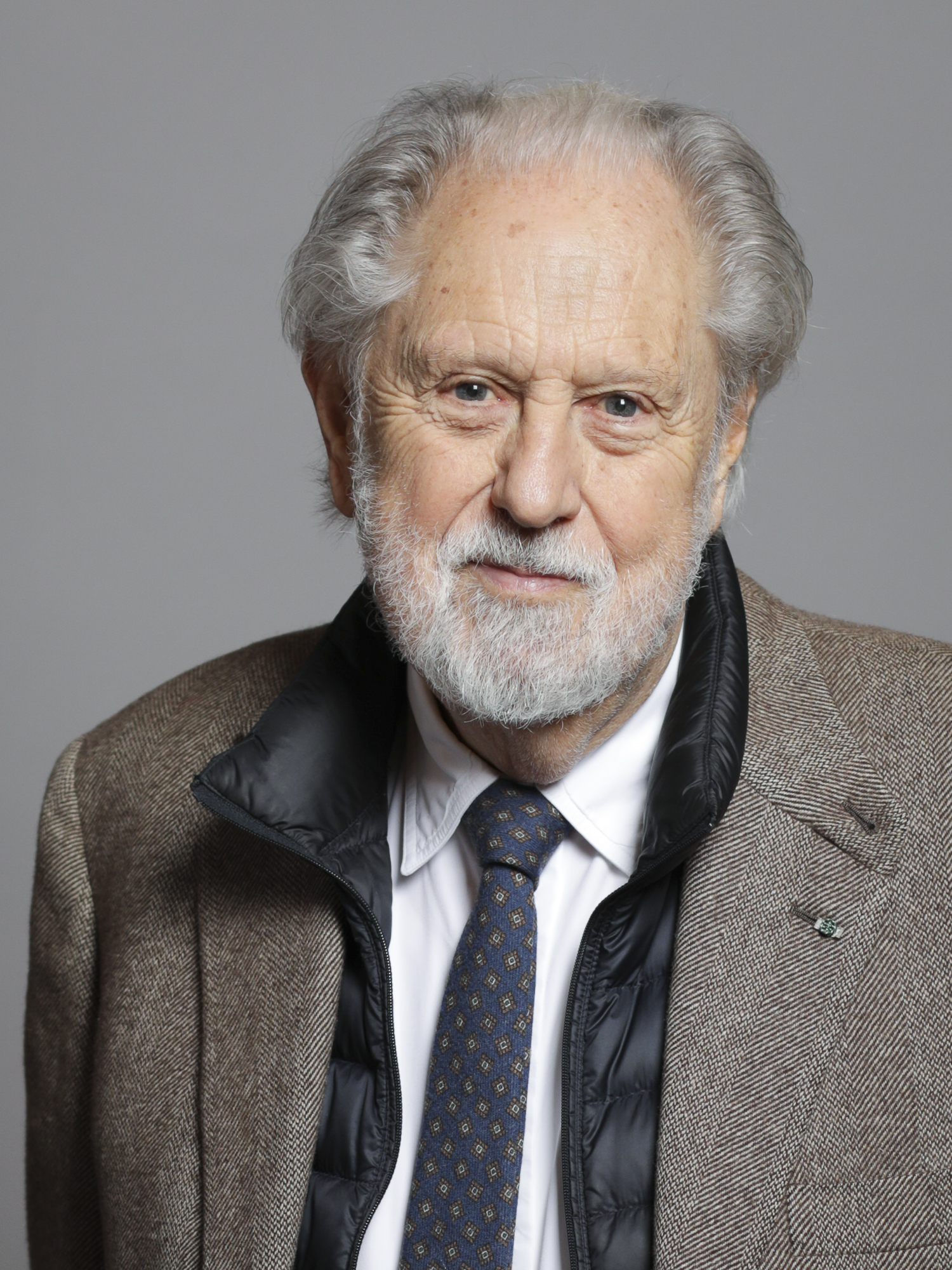
- Official portrait, 2020

Chancellor of the Open University
- In office 3 October 2007 – 12 March 2014
- Preceded by: The Baroness Boothroyd
- Succeeded by: The Baroness Lane-Fox of Soho

Chancellor of the University of Sunderland
- In office 1997–2007
- Preceded by: Office established
- Succeeded by: Steve Cram

Member of the House of Lords
- Lord Temporal
- Life peerage 27 October 1997 – 27 October 2021

Personal details
- Born: David Terence Puttnam; 25 February 1941 (age 85) Southgate, Middlesex, England
- Party: Labour
- Spouse: Patricia Mary Jones (m. 1961)
- Children: 2
- Occupation: Film producer and educator
- Website: www.davidputtnam.com

David Terence Puttnam, Baron Puttnam (/ˈpʌtnəm/; born 25 February 1941) is a British-Irish film producer, educator, environmentalist and former member of the House of Lords. His productions include Chariots of Fire, which won the Academy Award for Best Picture, The Mission, The Killing Fields, Local Hero, Midnight Express and Memphis Belle. In 1982, he received the BAFTA for Outstanding British Contribution to Cinema, and in 2006 he was awarded the BAFTA Fellowship for lifetime achievement from the British Academy of Film and Television Arts.

Between 1997 and 2021, Lord Puttnam sat on the Labour benches in the House of Lords. In 2019 he was appointed chair to the select committee on democracy and digital technologies. The committee published its findings in its Digital Technology & the Resurrection of Trust report in June 2020.

== Early life ==
David Terence Puttnam was born in Southgate, London, England, the son of Marie Beatrix, a housewife of Jewish origin, and Leonard Arthur Puttnam, a photographer. Educated at Minchenden Grammar School in London, Puttnam had an early career in advertising, including five formative years at Collett Dickenson Pearce, and as agent acting for the photographers David Bailey and Brian Duffy.

== Film career ==
=== Sandy Lieberson ===
Puttnam started in film production in the late 1960s, working with Sanford Lieberson's production company Goodtimes Enterprises. The first feature he produced was Melody (1971), based on a script by Alan Parker, which was a minor hit.

Puttnam and Lieberson produced the documentaries Peacemaking 1919 (1971), Glastonbury Fayre (1972), and Bringing It All Back Home (1972). Their second film, The Pied Piper (1972), directed by Jacques Demy was not a success, but That'll Be the Day (1973) with David Essex proved a hit.

Puttnam and Lieberson went on to produce The Final Programme (1973), a science fiction film, and made some more documentaries, these being Double Headed Eagle: Hitler's Rise to Power 1918–1933 (1973) and Swastika (1974).

Puttnam and Lieberson executive-produced the Ken Russell biopic Mahler (1974), and did a sequel to That'll Be The Day, entitled Stardust (1974) and directed by Michael Apted.

There were more documentaries: Radio Wonderful (1974), Brother, Can You Spare a Dime? (1975), James Dean: The First American Teenager (1975) and The Memory of Justice (1976).

A second film with Russell, Lisztomania (1975), was a box office disaster and led to the end of the Puttnam–Lieberson partnership.

Puttnam had a box office success with Bugsy Malone (1976), a musical he executive-produced, written and directed by Alan Parker, and produced by Alan Marshall. It was the last film Puttnam would make under the 'Goodtimes' banner. He went on to set up a new company, Enigma Films.

=== Enigma Films ===
Puttnam produced The Duellists (1977), the directorial debut of Ridley Scott; and with Marshall once more, he produced Midnight Express (1978), directed by Parker from a script by Oliver Stone, and which was a notable box office success.

Puttnam made his first film in America, Foxes (1980), which was the directorial debut of Adrian Lyne. It was a box office flop and was met with mixed critical reception, although it has since gained a cult following.

Puttnam's next film was his most successful yet. Chariots of Fire (1981), the first feature directed by Hugh Hudson, became a massive hit and won the Academy Award for Best Picture. It was produced in association with Goldcrest Pictures.

Puttnam set up a television company, Enigma TV, and made a series of television films in association with Goldcrest, which carried Puttnam's name as executive producer. Six were made as a series called First Love for the fledgling Channel Four: P'tang, Yang, Kipperbang (1982), directed by Apted; Experience Preferred... But Not Essential (1982); Secrets (1983); Those Glory Glory Days (1983); Sharma and Beyond (1983); and Arthur's Hallowed Ground (1984). Other films produced for television were Forever Young (1983); Red Monarch (1983); and Winter Flight (1984).

Puttnam continued to produce feature films. He had another success with Local Hero (1983), written and directed by Bill Forsyth; and also produced the Cal (1984) directed by Pat O'Connor, and The Killing Fields (1984), directed by Roland Joffe.

Puttnam continued to executive produce television movies such as The Frog Prince (1985), Mr. Love (1985), Defence of the Realm (1986), and Knights & Emeralds (1986). He also produced The Mission (1986), directed by Joffe from a script by Robert Bolt, which won the Palme d'Or at the Cannes Film Festival in 1986.

=== Columbia Pictures ===
Puttnam was chairman and CEO of Columbia Pictures from June 1986 until September 1987.

He oversaw a $270 million, four-year film package, initially planning for 15–18 films annually, then 15 films annually. He handled acquisitions such as The Big Easy and Spike Lee's low budget feature School Daze. He abandoned big-budget films for smaller features and allow current contracts to expire. This shift was met with disapproval from both Coca-Cola and Hollywood.

=== Post-Columbia producing work ===
Puttnam returned to producing individual films with Memphis Belle (1990), Meeting Venus (1991), A Dangerous Man: Lawrence After Arabia (1992), Being Human (1994), War of the Buttons (1994), The Confessional (1994), and My Life So Far (1995). He also executive-produced The Josephine Baker Story (1991), Without Warning: The James Brady Story (1992), and The Burning Season (1994).

Puttnam returned to film production in 2015 to oversee pre-production of Don’t Trust, Don’t Fear, Don’t Beg, Ben Stewart's account of the Arctic 30 incident. He stepped away from the role in 2019 when he was appointed to chair the House of Lords Special Committee ‘Democracy and Digital Technology’.

Puttnam is the President of the Film Distributors’ Association; Chair of the TSL Advisory Board; Chair of Nord Anglia International School, Dublin; Life President, National Film & Television School, a UNICEF Ambassador, and Adjunct Professor of Film Studies and Digital Humanities at University College Cork.

== Politics ==
In 1997, Puttnam entered the House of Lords as a life peer and was granted Letters Patent to become Baron Puttnam, of Queensgate in the Royal Borough of Kensington and Chelsea. In 1998, he was named in a list of the biggest private financial donors to the Labour Party. In 2002, he chaired the joint scrutiny committee on the Communications Bill, which recommended an amendment to prevent ownership of British terrestrial television stations by companies with a significant share of the newspaper market. This was widely interpreted as being aimed at stopping Rupert Murdoch's News Corporation from buying Channel Five. When the government opposed the amendment, Puttnam brokered a compromise with the introduction of a 'public interest' test, to be applied by the new regulator Ofcom but without explicit restrictions.

From 2004 to 2005, Puttnam chaired the Hansard Society Commission on Communication of Parliamentary Democracy, the final report of which urged all political parties to commit to a renewal of parliamentary life in an attempt to reinvigorate representative democracy. In 2007, he chaired the Joint Parliamentary Committee on the Draft Climate Change Bill.

From 2012 to 2017, Puttnam was the Prime Ministerial Trade Envoy to Vietnam, Laos, Cambodia and Myanmar (Burma). During the same period, Puttnam, who lives in Skibbereen, County Cork, was named Ireland's Digital Champion by Communications Minister Pat Rabbitte.

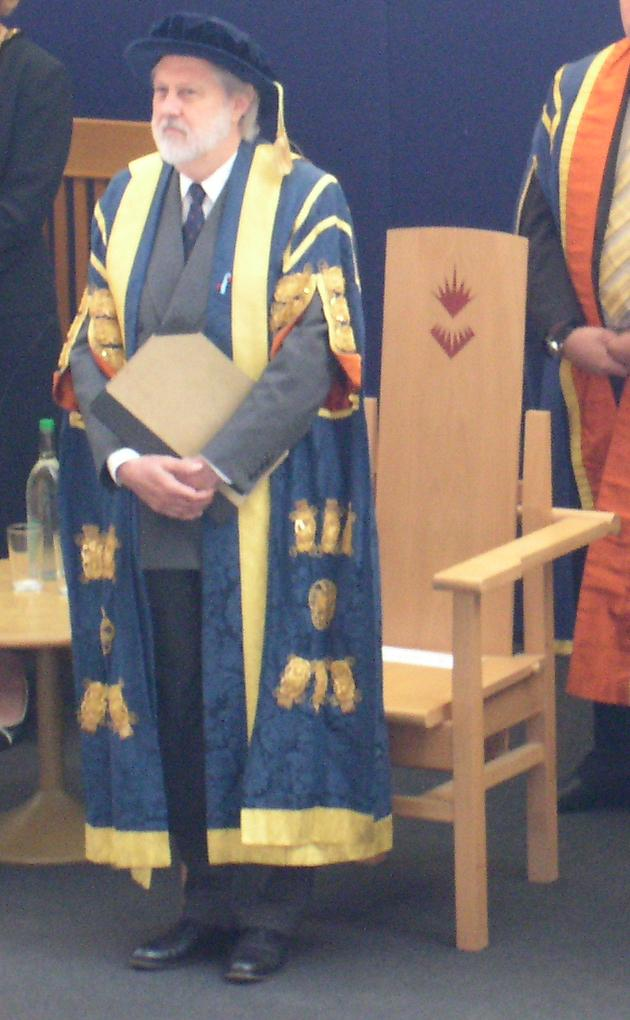
Lord Puttnam on 10 July 2006 at the University of Sunderland School of Computing and Technology Awards Ceremony

In August 2014, Puttnam was one of 200 public figures who were signatories to a letter to The Guardian opposing Scottish independence in the run-up to September's referendum on that issue.

In June 2019, Puttnam chaired the special House of Lords Democracy and Digital Technologies Committee, set up to investigate the impact of digital technologies on democracy and oversaw the publication of its findings in June 2020. The report, Digital Technology & the Resurrection of Trust, made 45 recommendations to government to address the spread of misinformation and disinformation and the consequential erosion of public trust. And that the media has a duty to "balance freedom of expression with wider moral and social responsibilities."

Puttnam announced his retirement from the House of Lords in October 2021, as he delivered the Shirley Williams Lecture, detailing his reasons for leaving in his speech.

== Atticus Education ==
Puttnam founded Atticus Education in 2012. Atticus delivers interactive seminars on film and a variety of other subjects to educational institutions around the world.

== Association with education ==
For 10 years, Puttnam was chairman of the National Film and Television School whose alumni included people such as Nick Park; and in 2017, he succeeded Richard Attenborough as Life President. Puttnam founded Skillset, which trains young people to become members of the film and television industries. From 2002 to 2009, he was UK president of UNICEF and remains an ambassador.

Puttnam was the first Chancellor of the University of Sunderland from 1997 until 13 July 2007. He was appointed an Honorary Doctor of Education during the School of Education and Lifelong Learning's Academic Awards Ceremonies and upon his retirement, he was granted the Freedom of the City of Sunderland. In 1998, he founded the National Teaching Awards and became its first chairman. He was the founding chairman of the General Teaching Council from 2000 to 2002, was appointed as Chancellor of the Open University from 2006 to 2017, and was also the Chairman of NESTA (The National Endowment for Science, Technology and the Arts) from 1998 until 2003. He was also on the board of directors of learning technologies company Promethean.

Puttnam is the patron of Schools North East, an organisation set up in 2007 to represent all schools in the North East of England. He is also a patron of the Shakespeare Schools Festival (now Shakespeare Schools Foundation), a charity that enables school children across the UK to perform Shakespeare in professional theatres.

In 2012 he founded Atticus Education, delivering interactive seminars on film, media and screen to students at universities all over the world.

From May 2014 until 2018, Puttnam was Chair of the Academic Board for Pearson College, part of Pearson PLC, the first FTSE 100 company to offer degrees in the UK. In March 2015, Puttnam was made a freeman at the Metropolitan Borough of Gateshead, in recognition of his service as chairman at the Sage Gateshead.

Puttnam was a member of the Commonwealth of Learning's Board of Governors until January 2020 and stood down as Chair of Film London Executive Task Force in 2022. As well as being Chair of Atticus Education, today he holds a number of positions including President of the Film Distributors’ Association, Chair of the NAE Education Advisory Board, leading on the Groups Digital Transformation, Life President of the National Film & Television School, UNICEF Ambassador, Member of the Advisory Board of Accenture (Ireland), Adjunct Professor of Film Studies and Digital Humanities at University College Cork, Adjunct Professor of the School of Media & Communications at RMIT University (Australia), Patron of the Dublin Bid World Summit on Media for Children 2020/2023 and International Ambassador, WWF. He is a member of the ASA (Advertising Standards Authority) Parliamentary Network.

In October 2022 Lord Puttnam was awarded a fellowship by adult education provider City Lit, for his contribution to the world of film and media.

== Awards ==
In 1982, Puttnam received the BAFTA Michael Balcon Award for his outstanding contribution to the British Film Industry.

In 1983, Puttnam was appointed CBE. In 1995, he was appointed as a Knight Bachelor.

In February 2006, Puttnam was awarded the BAFTA Fellowship. He made the occasion notable by delivering a particularly moving homage to his late father, who had died before he could see his son receive the Best Picture Oscar for Chariots of Fire. He also congratulated contemporary filmmakers for making films with integrity: the lack of such films being produced had been the reason for his retirement from the film industry in the late 1990s.

Puttnam is the recipient of over 50 honorary degrees and fellowships from the UK and overseas: he received an Honorary Doctorate from Heriot-Watt University in 2001, and from Trinity College Dublin in 2016; he was awarded the Royal Photographic Society's President's Medal and Honorary Fellowship (HonFRPS) in recognition of a sustained, significant contribution to the art of photography in 2003; and, in May 2006, he was made an Honorary Fellow of the Royal Society of Arts.

On 12 July 2007, Puttnam was given the freedom of the City of Sunderland. In 2008, he received an Honorary Degree of Doctor of Science from Nottingham Trent University in recognition of his extraordinary contribution to the cultural landscape of the UK, in both economic and creative terms, and for his notable support for the Nottingham City-based GameCity Festival. He was elected to the Royal Irish Academy in 2017.

Puttnam suffers from ME, debilitating him on occasions.

In 2009, in partnership with Sir Michael Barber, Puttnam released We Are the People We've Been Waiting For, an education documentary featuring high-profile figures discussing their own experiences of education.

All in all, Puttnam's films have won 10 Oscars, 31 BAFTAs, 13 Golden Globes, nine Emmys, four David di Donatellos in Italy and the Palme d'Or at Cannes.

Coat of arms of David Puttnam
Crest A harp standing on a closed book fesswise Proper bound Gules. Escutcheon Or within an orle of roses a gateway composed of a central arch between two lesse arches and surmounted by a segmental pediment Gules. Supporters Dexter, a curlew Proper gorged with a plain collar Argent charged with square billets Sable; sinister, a stork Proper gorged with a plain collar Argent charged with square billets sable. Motto Servio Ut Vivam

== Other interests ==
Puttnam was deputy Chairman of Channel 4 Television from 2006 to 2012. He is president of the Film Distributors' Association (FDA) and chair of the TSL Advisory Board.

Puttnam co-authored (with Neil Watson) Movies and Money, published in January 2000 by Vintage Books.

When Puttnam became the chairman of Profero, a London-based digital marketing agency in April 2007, he explained the move saying: "My experience over the past forty-odd (some very odd) years has encompassed marketing, entertainment and social issues, a fascinating mix that is integral to the daily lives of consumers and citizens. A business that can combine and magnify these dynamics can only create incredible value for their clients and, as a by-product, themselves. To me Profero is in just such a position, and it's now my job to help them realise their potential."

Puttnam, who had produced Ian Charleson's star-making film Chariots of Fire, contributed a chapter to the 1990 book, For Ian Charleson: A Tribute.

On 19 August 2007, Puttnam gave the oration at the annual Michael Collins commemoration in Béal na Bláth, County Cork.

He has also preached at Durham Cathedral at the feast of the cathedral's commemoration of its founders and benefactors.

== Philanthropy ==
Puttnam is patron of the Irish education charity Camara Education and CFS/ME charity Action for ME.

== Personal life ==
On 21 June 2022, Puttnam announced via Twitter that he and his wife, Patricia, had obtained Irish citizenship. The couple have lived in Skibbereen, County Cork, since 1998.

== Filmography ==
=== Selected filmography as producer ===
- Melody (1971)
- The Pied Piper (1972)
- Glastonbury Fayre (1972) (documentary)
- That'll Be the Day (1973)
- Mahler (1974)
- Stardust (1974)
- Lisztomania (1975)
- Trick or Treat (1975) (unfinished)
- Bugsy Malone (1976)
- The Duellists (1977)
- Midnight Express (1978)
- Foxes (1980)
- Chariots of Fire (1981)
- Local Hero (1982)
- Secrets (1983)
- Sharma and Beyond (1984)
- The Killing Fields (1984)
- Cal (1984)
- The Mission (1986)
- Memphis Belle (1990)
- Meeting Venus (1991)
- Being Human (1994)
- War of the Buttons (1994)
- My Life So Far (1999)

=== Some films made or bought while head of Columbia (1986–1988) ===
Puttnam greenlit and acquired a number of films while head of the studio, only some of which had been released by the time he left the position. They included:

- The Adventures of Baron Munchausen (1988)
- The Adventures of Milo and Otis (1989) (acquisition)
- The Beast (1988)
- The Big Easy (1986) (acquisition)
- The Big Town (1987)
- Hope and Glory (1987) (acquisition)
- Housekeeping (1987)
- La Bamba (1987)
- The Last Emperor (1987)
- Leonard Part 6 (1987)
- Little Nikita (1988)
- Old Gringo (1989)
- Me and Him (1988)
- The New Adventures of Pippi Longstocking (1988)
- Pulse (1988)
- Punchline (1988)
- Rocket Gibraltar (1988)
- School Daze (1988)
- Someone to Watch Over Me (1987)
- Stars and Bars (1988)
- Time of the Gypsies (1988) (acquisition)
- A Time of Destiny (1988)
- Vibes (1988)
- Vice Versa (1988)
- Welcome Home (1989)
- Zelly and Me (1988)

Academic offices
Preceded by First holder	Chancellor of the University of Sunderland; 1997–2007	Succeeded by Steve Cram
Preceded by The Baroness Boothroyd	Chancellor of the Open University; 2006–2014	Succeeded by The Baroness Lane-Fox of Soho
Orders of precedence in the United Kingdom
Preceded by The Lord Dholakia	Gentlemen; Baron Puttnam	Followed by The Lord Naseby
