= Iain Smith (producer) =

Scottish film producer

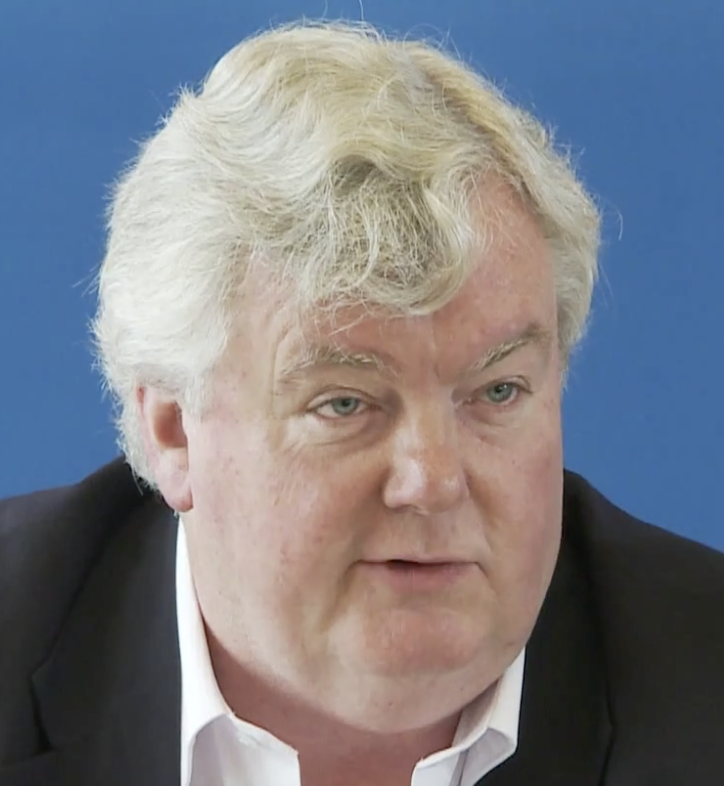
Smith speaking at a press conference at the World Intellectual Property Organization in 2011

Iain Smith OBE (born 8 January 1949 in Glasgow, Scotland) is a Scottish film producer. He is known for his productions of Mad Max: Fury Road (2015), The Fountain (2006), Children of Men (2006) and The Fifth Element (1997), among others.

== Biography ==
Iain Smith was educated in Glasgow. He received a 1st Class Hons Diploma from London School of Film Technique (1969/70).

In the early 1970s, Smith worked as an assistant editor, assistant director or production manager on numerous short films, commercials and children's feature films. He worked in London for several years before returning to his native Scotland to make (uncredited) My Childhood for the British Film Institute, the first of the trilogy by Bill Douglas.

In 1976, Smith formed his own production company in partnership with Jon Schorstein (Smith Schorstein Associates Ltd) and produced television commercials, documentaries, children's feature films and low-budget dramas. In 1978, his production-managed Bertrand Tavernier's Death Watch, starring Romy Schneider and Harvey Keitel. A year later, he joined David Puttnam and Hugh Hudson, as the location manager for Chariots of Fire, starring Ian Charleson and Ben Cross.

Smith went on to line produce a variety of films for David Puttnam, getting associate producer credit on Bill Forsyth's Local Hero, starring Burt Lancaster and Peter Riegert, Roland Joffe's The Killing Fields, starring Sam Waterston and Haing Ngor, and Roland Joffe's The Mission, starring Robert De Niro and Jeremy Irons. He also produced Brian Gilbert's The Frog Prince.

In 1987, Smith formed Applecross Productions and went on to co-produce Richard Marquand's Hearts of Fire, starring Bob Dylan and Rupert Everett, followed by Michael Austen's Killing Dad, starring Richard E. Grant, Denholm Elliott and Julie Walters. In 1991, he co-produced Roland Joffe's City of Joy, starring Patrick Swayze and Pauline Collins, and in 1992, executive produced Ridley Scott's 1492: Conquest of Paradise, starring Gérard Depardieu and Sigourney Weaver.

In 1994, Smith co-produced Stephen Frears's Mary Reilly, starring Julia Roberts and John Malkovich for Tristar Pictures, followed by Luc Besson's The Fifth Element in 1996, which starred Bruce Willis and Gary Oldman and was produced by his company Zaltman Films Ltd for Gaumont.

He then produced Jean-Jacques Annaud's Seven Years in Tibet, starring Brad Pitt and David Thewlis for Columbia Pictures, followed by Jon Amiel's Entrapment with Sean Connery and Catherine Zeta-Jones for 20th Century Fox.

Smith executive produced Tony Scott's Spy Game for Universal Pictures, which starred Robert Redford and Brad Pitt, followed by Anthony Minghella's Cold Mountain for Miramax, starring Jude Law, Nicole Kidman and Renée Zellweger. He went on to produce Oliver Stone's Alexander for Intermedia, starring Colin Farrell, Anthony Hopkins and Angelina Jolie, followed by producing Darren Aronofsky's The Fountain for New Regency/Warner Bros., starring Hugh Jackman, Rachel Weisz and Ellen Burstyn, and Alfonso Cuarón's Children of Men for Strike Entertainment/Universal Pictures.

In 2005, he was awarded a BAFTA Scotland for Outstanding Achievement in Film. He also was appointed Officer of the Order of the British Empire (OBE) in the 2008 New Year Honours.

In 2008, Smith produced Timur Bekmambetov's Wanted for Universal Pictures followed in 2010 by Joe Carnahan's The A-Team for Twentieth Century Fox. In 2012/13 he executive produced George Miller's "Mad Max: Fury Road" for Warner Bros, and in 2013/14 he is producing the series "24 Live Another Day" for 20th Century Fox Television.

== Membership ==
Iain Smith has served on the boards of the UK Film Council, Scottish Screen, the Joint board of Creative Scotland, the Scottish Film Council, the Scottish Film Production Fund, the Scottish Film Training Trust as a governor of the National Film and Television School, a director of the Children’s Film and Television Foundation, and as chair of the Edinburgh International Film Festival. He is currently a patron of the London Film School, chair of the Film Skills Council, and chair of the Film Industry Training Board. He is a member of the British Academy of Film and Television Arts, the Production Guild of Great Britain, and the Producers Guild of America. Smith is also Keeper of the Lair, Glasgow Necropolis (2010).

In 2011, Iain Smith was appointed chair of the British Film Commission. He is often called upon to speak about the film industry – Scottish, British and global. In 2011, he gave a hallmark speech at a United Nations' WIPO conference.
