= Secrets (1983 film) =

- Written by: Noella Smith
- Directed by: Gavin Millar
- Starring: Helen Lindsay; John Horsley; Anna Campbell-Jones; Daisy Cockburn
- Music by: Guy Woolfenden
- Country of origin: United Kingdom
- Original language: English

Production
- Producers: David Puttnam; Chris Griffin
- Cinematography: Christopher Challis
- Editor: Eric Boyd-Perkins
- Running time: 77 minutes
- Production companies: Goldcrest Films; Enigma Productions

Original release
- Network: Channel 4
- Release: 12 May 1983

Secrets is a 1983 British comedy film directed by Gavin Millar and produced by David Puttnam. It was originally shown as part of Puttnam's Channel 4 anthology series First Love.

== Plot ==
In the fall of 1963, Louise is a 13-year-old girl who lives with her widowed mother. Before she is set to leave for boarding school, she discovers a box belonging to her late father. The box contains secret documents in additions to condoms, but Louise thinks they are balloons. She also learns her father was a member of the secret order of Freemasons. While at boarding school, Louise attempts to explain to friends what the Freemasons are. The girls form their own version of a Masonic club. Meanwhile, Louise’s mother finds the box in Louise’s room and inadvertently thinks her daughter is sexually active. Louise learns her parents’ marriage was not what she thought it was.

== Production ==
Goldcrest Films invested £461,000 in the movie and received £620,000 earning them a profit of £159,000.

== Cast ==
- Helen Lindsay as Mother
- John Horsley as Dr. Jefferies
- Anna Campbell-Jones as Louise
- Daisy Cockburn as Sydney
- Rebecca Johnson as Trottie
- Lucy Goode as Jane
- Richard Tolan as Paul
- Carol Gillies as Miss Quick
- Jane Briers as Miss Strickland
- Judith Fellows as Elderly Teacher
- Georgine Anderson as Matron
- Cynthia Grenville as Miss Johnson
- Elizabeth Choice as Miss Jones Wallace
- Matyelok Gibbs as Miss Lane

== Reception ==
In a review of the film, the Santa Cruz Sentinel wrote Secrets is "not large enough to fill a movie screen in any way, shape or form ... but it is kind of sweet". Rebecca Lieb of The Film Journal called the film "a light, entertaining, and often very funny comedy...enhanced with an acute sense of what it's like to be 13 and discovering sex".
