= Jeanne Herviale =

French actress (1908–1989)

- Born: 24 December 1908; Paris, France
- Died: 29 October 1989 (aged 80); Lot, Midi-Pyrénées, France
- Occupation: Actress
- Years active: 1946–1989

Jeanne Herviale (24 December 1908 – 29 October 1989) was a French actress. She appeared in 85 films and television shows between 1946 and 1989.

== Partial filmography ==
- Mr. Orchid (1946) – Marie
- The Damned (1947) – La bonne du docteur (uncredited)
- Clochemerle (1948) – Honorine
- Dieu a besoin des hommes (1950)
- Les joyeux pélerins (1951) – Béatrice, la directrice du couvent
- Judgement of God (1952) – (uncredited)
- Procès au Vatican (1952)
- Les affreux (1959)
- The Lovers of Teruel (1962)
- Trois enfants... dans le désordre (1966) – Une ménagère (uncredited)
- Is Paris Burning? (1966) – Minor Role (uncredited)
- Erotissimo (1969)
- I. You. They. (1969) – La vieille femme interviewée
- Elle court, elle court la banlieue (1973) – La propriétaire
- Themroc (1973) – Themroc's mother
- La gueule de l'emploi (1974)
- Le soleil qui rit rouge (1974) – Madame Holle
- Comment réussir quand on est con et pleurnichard (1974) – Maman Robineau
- Les noces de porcelaine (1975) – Marie
- C'est dur pour tout le monde (1975) – La concierge
- Maîtresse (1976) – Concierge
- Cours après moi... que je t'attrape (1976) – La dame perception
- Un mari, c'est un mari (1976) – Mme Lasblaise
- Armaguedon (1977) – La tenancière de l'hôtel d'Ostende
- La nuit de Saint-Germain-des-Prés (1977)
- Violette Nozière (1978) – La grand-mère
- Série noire (1979) – La tante
- A Little Romance (1979) – Woman in Metro Station
- Gros-Câlin (1979) – La concierge d'Irénée
- Two Lions in the Sun (1980) – La logeuse
- Inspecteur la Bavure (1980) – Denise Morzini
- Du blues dans la tête (1981) – Miss Doudoune
- Toutes griffes dehors (1982, TV Mini-Series)
- Sweet Inquest on Violence (1982) – La vieille dame
- Deadly Circuit (1983) – Vittel's aunt
- Le jeune marié (1983) – Old lady
- Ave Maria (1984)
- La vengeance du serpent à plumes (1984) – la voisine attentionnee
- J'ai Rencontré Le Père Noël (1984) – Grandmother
- The Frog Prince (1985) – Madame Duclos
- Conseil de famille (1986)
- Dressage (1986) – Clémentine (la servante) (uncredited)
- Sale destin (1987) – La grand-mère d'Alexandre
- Les oreilles entre les dents (1987) – Lydie, la vieille folle
- Flag (1987) – La grand-mère de Nénesse
- Le diable rose (1988) – Clémentine
