= Nicholas Gecks =

British actor (born 1952)

- Born: 9 January 1952 (age 73); Penang, Malaysia
- Occupation: Actor

Nicholas Gecks is a British actor who appeared in Series Four of Rumpole of the Bailey as his modernising colleague Charles Hearthstoke.

== Early life ==
Gecks was born in Penang, Malaysia in 1952.

== Career ==
Gecks starred as Father Mike in the 1983 film Forever Young. His other film credits include roles in The Wicked Lady (1983), Parting Shots (1999), The Lazarus Child (2005) and Mutant Chronicles (2008).

On television he appeared as Rupert the eccentric artist whose sister goes missing in the first episodes in Television South's The Ruth Rendell Mysteries. He also appeared in Granada Television's The Return of Sherlock Holmes as James Wilder, in the episode "The Priory School" (1986).
