= Loch Tarff =

- Location within Scotland
- Location: Scottish Highlands
- Coordinates: 57.1537°N 4.6042°W
- Type: loch
- Basin countries: Scotland
- Surface elevation: 292 metres (958 ft)

Loch Tarff is a small freshwater loch approximately 1.25 kilometres (3/4 mile) from the southeastern shore of Loch Ness in the Scottish Highlands.

== Geography and geology ==
The loch is located in the hills that rise steeply from the eastern shore of Loch Ness and has an elevation of 292 metres (958 ft) ASL. It has a surface area of approximately 50 hectares (120 acres) with a prominent inlet to the northwest and a smaller inlet to the southwest. The loch is fed by a number of small streams, most of which enter its northeastern shore from the southern slopes of Beinn a' Bhacaidh. There are a number of islets in the loch, the largest of which, Eilean Bàn, lies near its northeastern shore.

Geological evidence indicates that the loch was formed in the last Ice Age approximately 10,000 years ago, and is the result of glaciation that scoured the landscape. The surrounding rock is metamorphic, mostly schists, although there are also sedimentary conglomerates formed from the metamorphic and igneous strata in the fault scarp that comprises the Great Glen. Glacial sediments can be found to the south of the loch around the southern shore of Loch Ness.

== Access ==
By car, the loch is approximately six kilometres (3 3/4 miles) from Fort Augustus, and is accessible by the B862 road, which runs along the eastern shore of the loch.

For walkers, the loch is located on the South Loch Ness Trail, approximately one and a half to two hours via an ascending route that rises 280 metres (920 ft) with two moderate inclines from the southern shore of Loch Ness at Fort Augustus.

== Appearances in media ==
Footage of the loch was used in the 1983 film Local Hero (in the scene immediately following the rabbit and the fog; the lead character's car, a Ford Cortina is stopped on the road). The scene is taken from the B862 looking westward and some of the loch's islets can be seen in the background.
