= Jacqueline Doyen =

French actress (1930–2006)

- Born: 14 February 1930; Paris, France
- Died: 3 September 2006 (aged 76); Mantes-la-Jolie, France
- Occupation: Actress
- Years active: 1956–1995

Jacqueline Doyen (14 February 1930 – 3 September 2006) was a French actress. She appeared in 80 films and television shows between 1956 and 1995.

== Filmography ==
- Le salaire du péché (1956) – (uncredited)
- L'étrange Monsieur Steve (1957)
- La roue (1957)
- Fernand clochard (1957)
- Les oeufs de l'autruche (1957) – (uncredited)
- La bonne tisane (1958) – La capitaine des girls
- Asphalte (1959) – (uncredited)
- Zazie dans le Métro (1960) – Permanent
- A Very Private Affair (1962) – Juliette
- La Vendetta (1962) – (uncredited)
- Parigi o cara (1962)
- We Will Go to Deauville (1962) – Fernande Mercier
- Fleur d'oseille (1967) – Une salope
- Une veuve en or (1969) – La voyante
- L'homme orchestre (1970) – Une automobiliste au feu rouge (uncredited)
- Le Cri du cormoran, le soir au-dessus des jonques (1971)
- Le drapeau noir flotte sur la marmite (1971) – Léontine Coulibeaux
- Sex-shop (1972)
- Ursule et Grelu (1974)
- O.K. patron (1974)
- Juliette et Juliette (1974) – Une ouvrière
- On s'est trompé d'histoire d'amour (1974) – La sage-femme
- Comment réussir quand on est con et pleurnichard (1974) – Mme Léonce
- Le rallye des joyeuses (1974) – Soeur Angelique
- Young Casanova (1974) – La baronne D'Ecieux
- Salut les frangines (1975) – Mme Lemoine
- Soldat Duroc, ça va être ta fête! (1975)
- Cher Victor (1975) – Micheline
- Hard Love (1975)
- 1Indécences (1975) – Une dame
- Docteur Françoise Gailland (1976) – Raymonde
- Perversions (1976) – Le couple au square
- Cours après moi... que je t'attrape (1976) – La secrétaire de Paul
- L'essayeuse (1976) – Older Female Client
- Le Juge Fayard dit Le Shériff (1977) – Mme Fayolle
- Dis bonjour à la dame!.. (1977) – La mère supérieure
- Dear Inspector (1977) – Madame Melun
- Monsieur Papa (1977)
- Peppermint Soda (1977) – Petitbon
- Take It from the Top (1978) – La mère d'Annie
- Je vous ferai aimer la vie (1979)
- Coup de tête (1979) – Mme Lozerand
- Le coup de sirocco (1979) – Dame de la Croix-Rouge
- Cause toujours... tu m'intéresses! (1979) – La concierge
- Nous maigrirons ensemble (1979) – directrice Weight Watchers
- Gros-Câlin (1979) – Mme Niatte
- Julien Fontanes, magistrat (1980–1986, TV Series) – Sophie Legros / Mme Lanaud / La commère
- Pile ou face (1980)
- Voulez-vous un bébé Nobel? (1980) – Madame Paul
- Viens chez moi, j'habite chez une copine (1981) – La dame au piano
- La vie continue (1981) – Monique
- A Thousand Billion Dollars (1982) – Arlène Robert
- Better Late Than Never (1983) – Head Nurse
- Entre Nous (1983) – Mme Vernier
- Charlots connection (1984) – L'autre tante blanchisseuse
- Le garde du corps (1984) – Yvette, la mère de Paul
- Adieu Blaireau (1985) – Mimi
- The Frog Prince (1985) – Madame Peroche
- Twist again à Moscou (1986)
- Club de rencontres (1987)
- Chouans! (1988) – L'Abesse
- Sam suffit (1992) – La bourgeoise
