= Gros-Câlin =

- Directed by: Jean-Pierre Rawson
- Written by: Age & Scarpelli; Elvio Porta
- Produced by: Jacques Dorfmann; Anne-Marie Toursky
- Starring: Jean Carmet; Nino Manfredi
- Cinematography: Claude Becognee
- Edited by: Jacqueline Thiédot
- Music by: Jean-Pierre Doering
- Distributed by: Cinema International Corporation
- Release date: 1979
- Running time: 90 minutes
- Country: France
- Language: French

Gros-Câlin (Italian: Cocco mio) is a 1979 French-Italian comedy film written and directed by Jean-Pierre Rawson and starring Jean Carmet and Nino Manfredi. It is loosely based on the novel with the same name by Romain Gary.

== Cast ==
- Jean Carmet as Émile Cousin
- Nino Manfredi as Parisi
- Marthe Villalonga as Madame Astrid
- Veronique Mucret as Irene Dreyfus
- Jean-Pierre Coffe as Father Joseph
- Alvaro Vitali as Brancardier
- Jacqueline Doyen as Madame Niatte
- Jeanne Herviale as Irene's concierge
- Enrico Maria Salerno as The President
- Francis Perrin as Taxi Driver
- Katia Tchenko as The whore
