= Brian Gilbert (director) =

English film director

Brian Gilbert is a film director. Born in England, he spent much of his childhood in Australia, where he was a child actor of film, television and radio. Returning to England at the age of fourteen, he attended the Harrow County Grammar School for Boys and completed his education at Oxford University.

He continued working as a professional actor until 1979, when he joined the National Film and Television School as a directing student. So well-received was his graduation film, The Devotee that producer David Puttnam immediately commissioned him to write and direct a feature-length film for the Channel Four First Love series in the 1980s. From there, he went on to direct The Frog Prince (French Lessons US title), a French-English co-production.

Subsequently, he has worked in both Hollywood and the UK, directing Vice Versa in 1988, and Not Without My Daughter in 1991, the adaptation of the controversial best-seller of the same name, which starred Sally Field as Betty Mahmoody.

Four years later came Tom & Viv starring Willem Dafoe and Miranda Richardson, the story of poet T. S. Eliot's first marriage, nominated for two Academy Awards. This was eventually followed by the 1997 production Wilde, starring Jude Law and Stephen Fry, based on the Richard Ellmann biography of Oscar Wilde. In 2003, he directed The Gathering, starring Christina Ricci. He wrote and directed the documentary Lord Haw-Haw: Portrait of a Fanatic for UK and Irish television, and in 2006, directed the stage version of Mary Kenny's play Allegiance, starring Mel Smith, and produced by Daniel Jewel, at the Edinburgh Festival. He is currently a regular guest tutor at the National Film and Television School.

== Filmography ==
- Allegiance (2005)
- Lord Haw-Haw: Portrait of a Fanatic - 2005
- The Gathering - 2003
- Wilde - 1997
- Tom & Viv - 1994
- Not Without My Daughter - 1991
- Vice Versa - 1988
- French Lesson - 1985
- Sharma and Beyond - 1984
