= Pennan =

Village in Aberdeenshire, Scotland

Coordinates: 57°40′44″N 2°15′39″W

Pennan: Scottish Gaelic: Am Binnean; Scots: Peenan
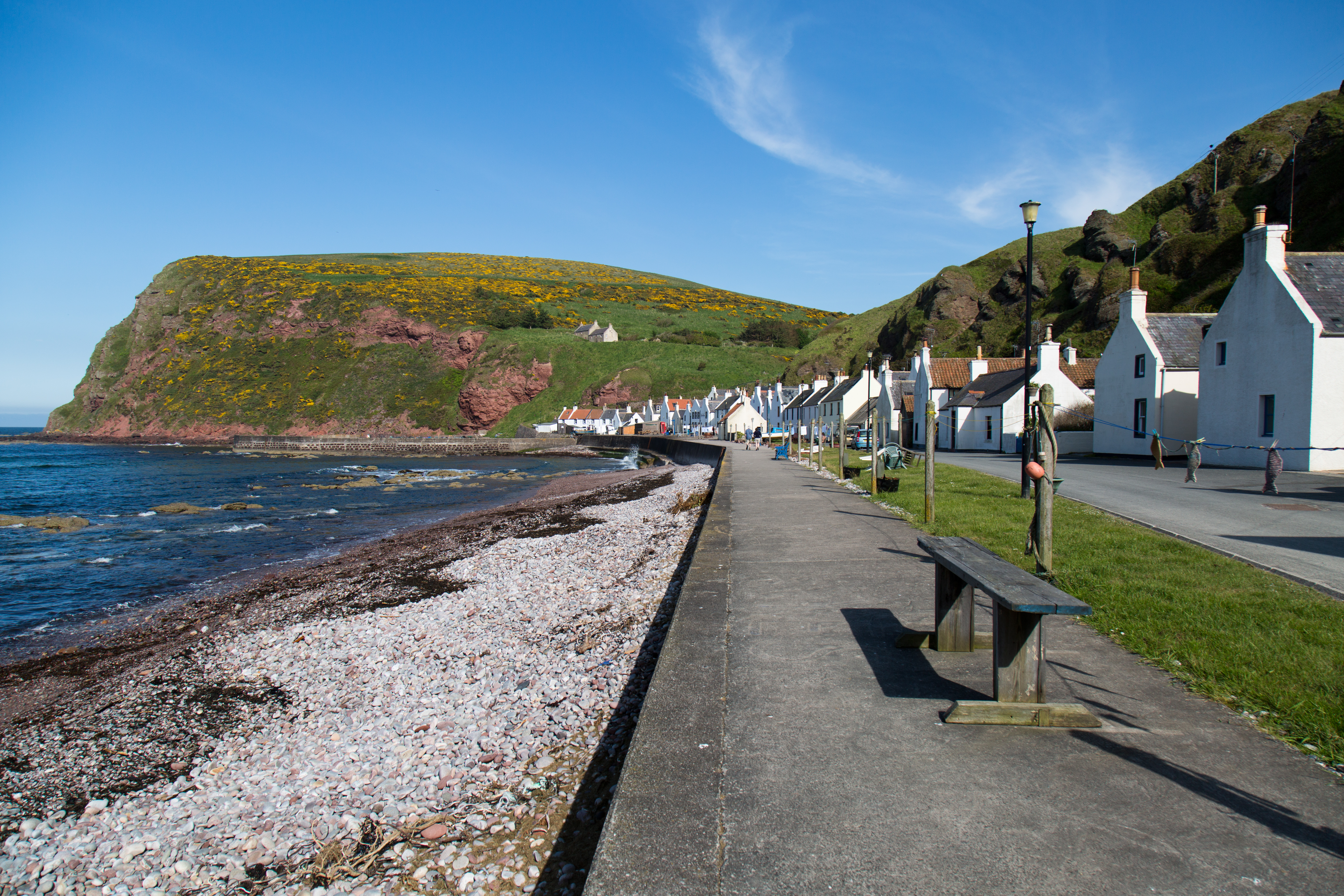
- Pennan

- Location within Aberdeenshire
- OS grid reference: NJ845655
- Council area: Aberdeenshire
- Lieutenancy area: Aberdeenshire
- Country: Scotland
- Sovereign state: United Kingdom
- Post town: FRASERBURGH
- Postcode district: AB43
- Dialling code: 01346
- Police: Scotland
- Fire: Scottish
- Ambulance: Scottish
- UK Parliament: Aberdeenshire North and Moray East
- Scottish Parliament: Banffshire and Buchan Coast

Pennan (Scots: Peenan) is a small village in Aberdeenshire, Scotland, consisting of a small harbour and a single row of homes, including a hotel. It is on the north-facing coast and is about one hour's drive from Aberdeen. It was formerly known as St Magnus Haven or Auchmedden.

== Etymology ==
The name Pennan was recorded in 1587 as Pennand. It is possibly derived from the Pictish element *pen meaning "head, end, promontory" (Welsh pen).

== Area history ==
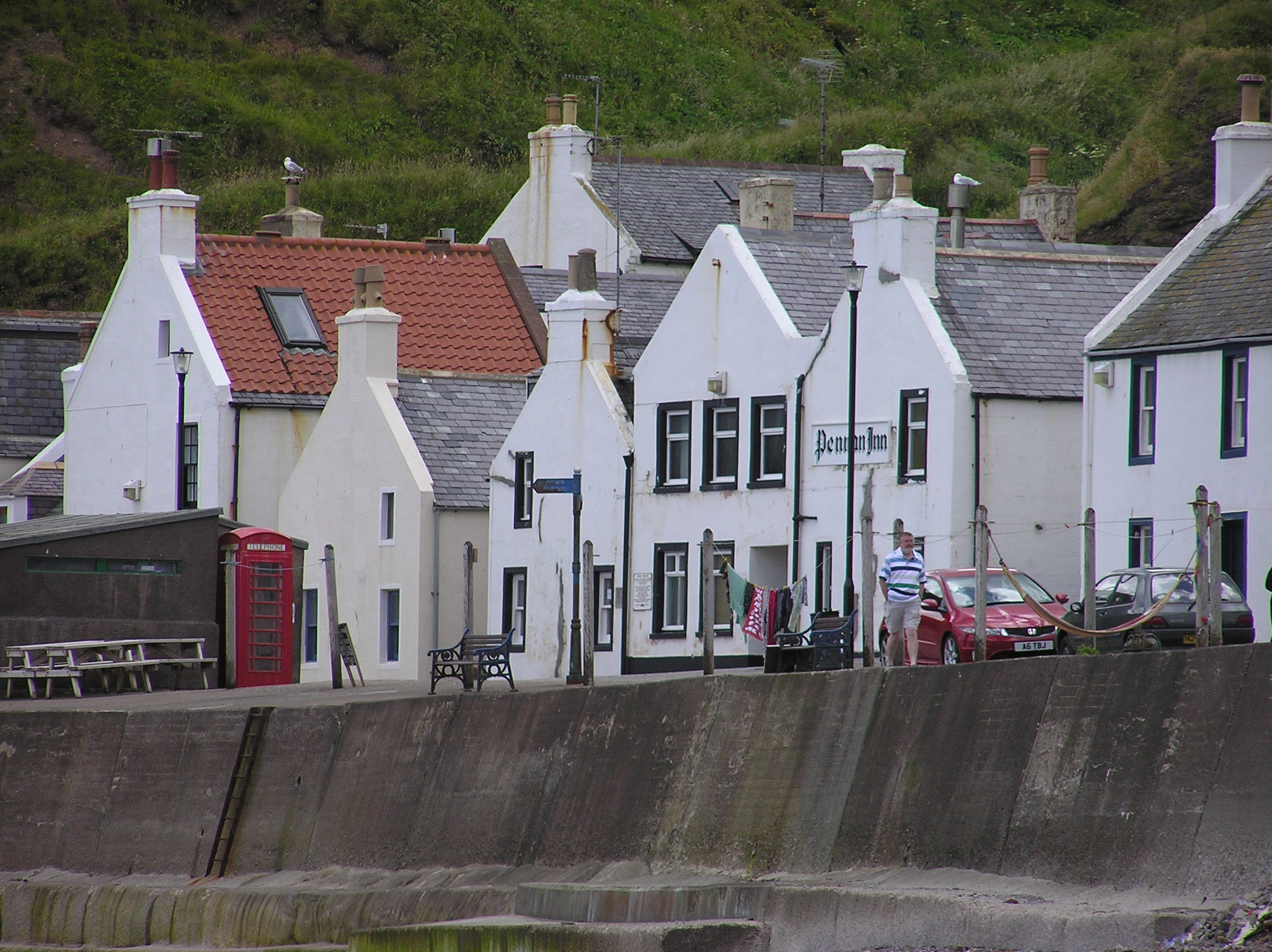
Pennan portrayed the fictional village of Ferness in Local Hero — the red telephone box is visible

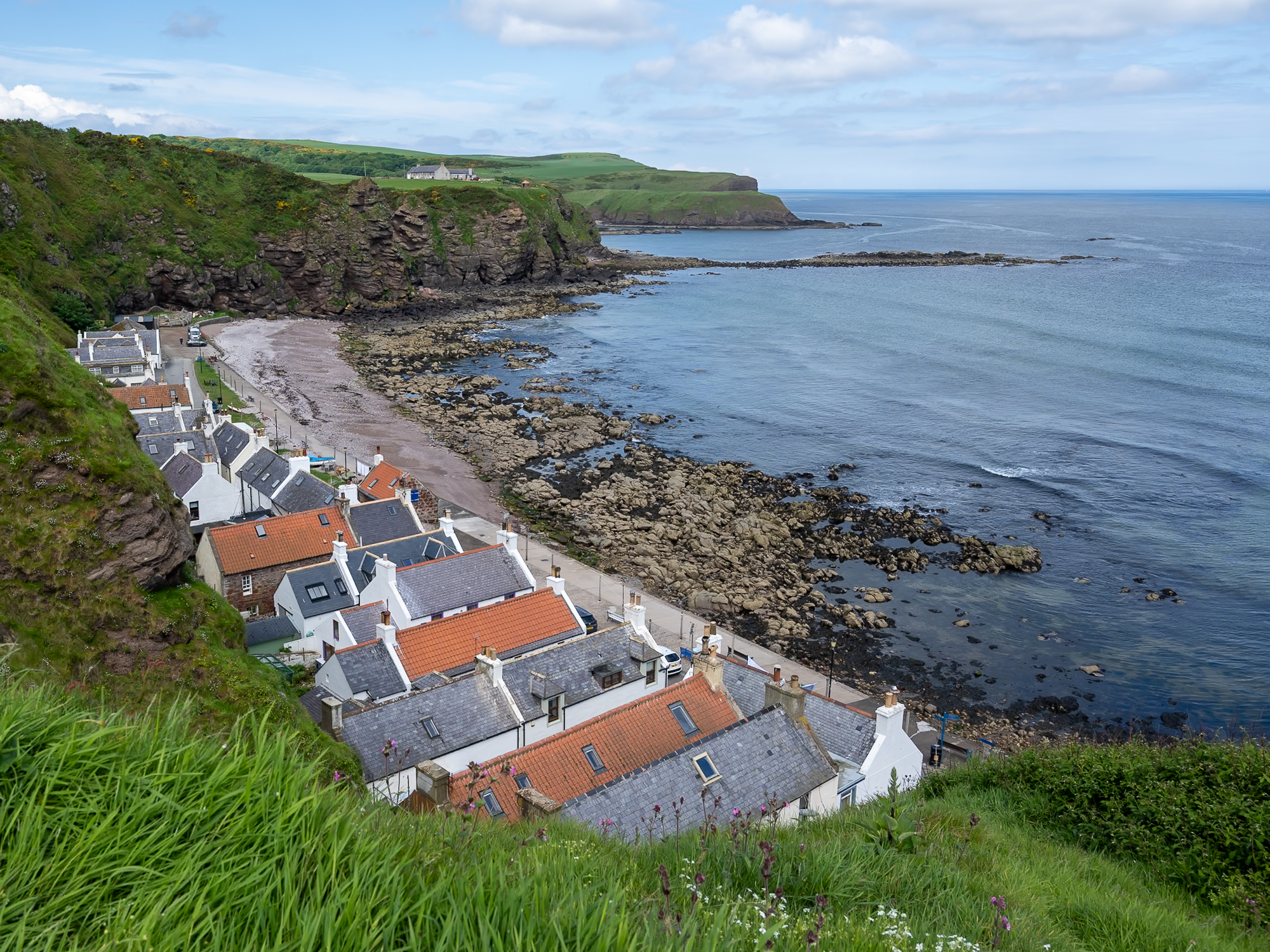
Pennan

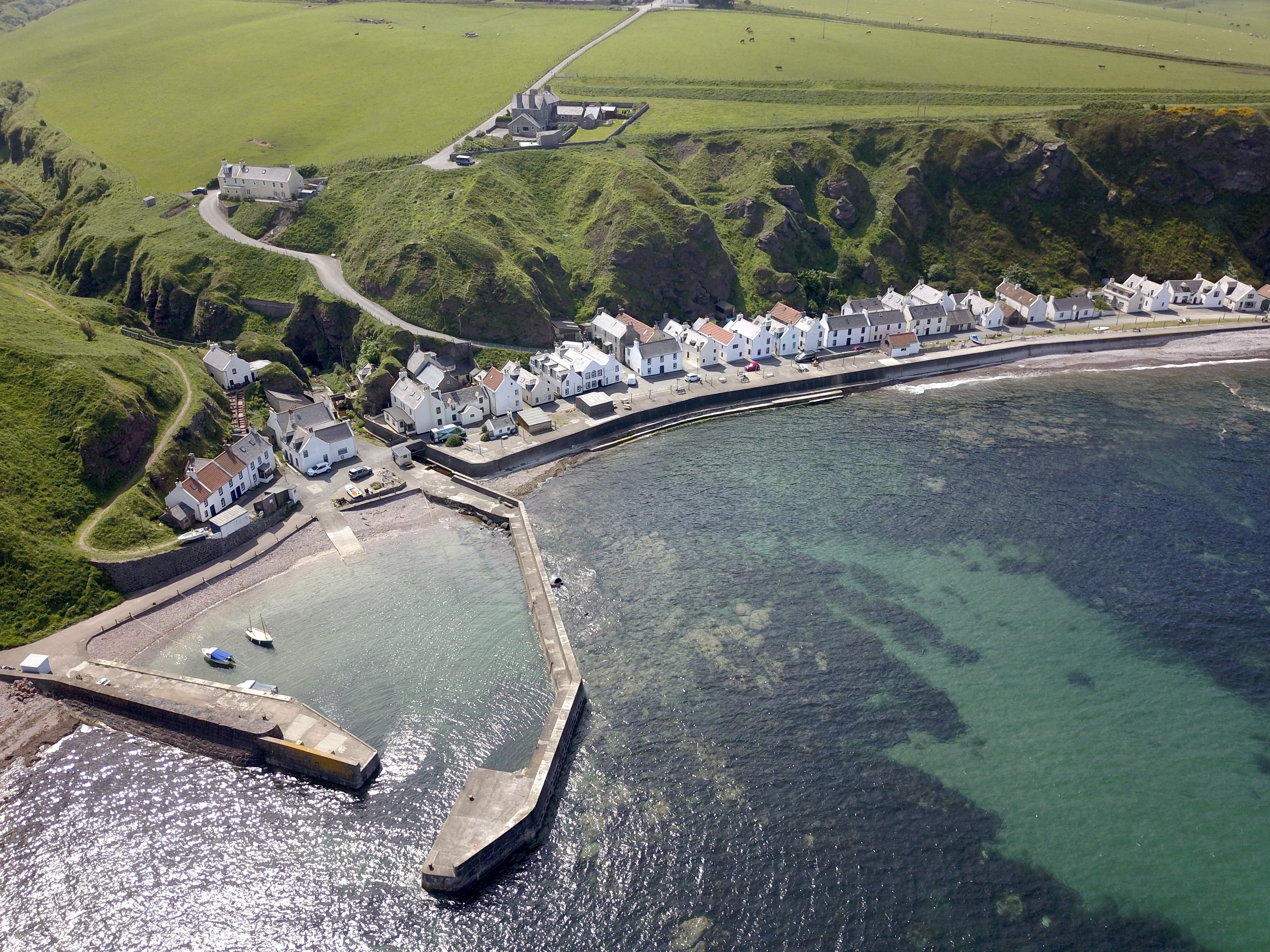
Aerial view of Pennan village

Pennan seems to have come into existence as a fishing village in the 18th century. The people of Pennan were dependent on the sea. Most families had small boats for their own personal use. Where the men would catch the fish, it was usually down to the women and children to try to sell it to clients in the country. Until the 1930s, the population of the village seems to have come under three main surnames – Watt, Gatt and West. In the last 50 years, most of the native families have moved out and most of the houses have been bought as holiday homes.

Pennan became famous in the 1980s for being used as one of the main locations for the film Local Hero, and representing the fictional village of Ferness. Film enthusiasts have come from all over the world to make a phone call in the red telephone box in the village. The phone box featured in the film was a prop. The genuine telephone box, a few yards away, was hidden from view during filming by a prop shed. The Pennan phone box (+44 (0)1346 6210) has been a listed building since 1989.

Landslips, especially one in 2007, have been damaging the village. In 2009 a 25-foot crack appeared on the cliff side, sparking calls for the village to be evacuated.

This part of Aberdeenshire was inhabited by prehistoric peoples since at least the Bronze Age. One of the most ancient extant monuments is the long barrow at Longman Hill.

The nearby harled early-19th-century farmhouse of Mains of Auchmedden "recall the palace of the Bairds of Auchmedden, demolished in the late 18th century". Some of its materials were possibly reused in New Pitsligo.

The Millshore Stone (125 kilograms (276 lb)) is a natural lifting stone, thought to be made of granite, next to Mill of Nethermill, the bay immediately west of Pennan.

== Fishing ==
The annual reports of the Fishery Board for Scotland provide an insight into the fishing in Pennan in the years before the First World War. The report for 1900 relates that "there is a small broken-down harbour at this creek, which gives very little shelter, and fishing is only possible in small boats. Fishing is declining....The fishermen fished herrings at Fraserburgh." The statistics show the gradual subsequent decline.

Fishery Statistics

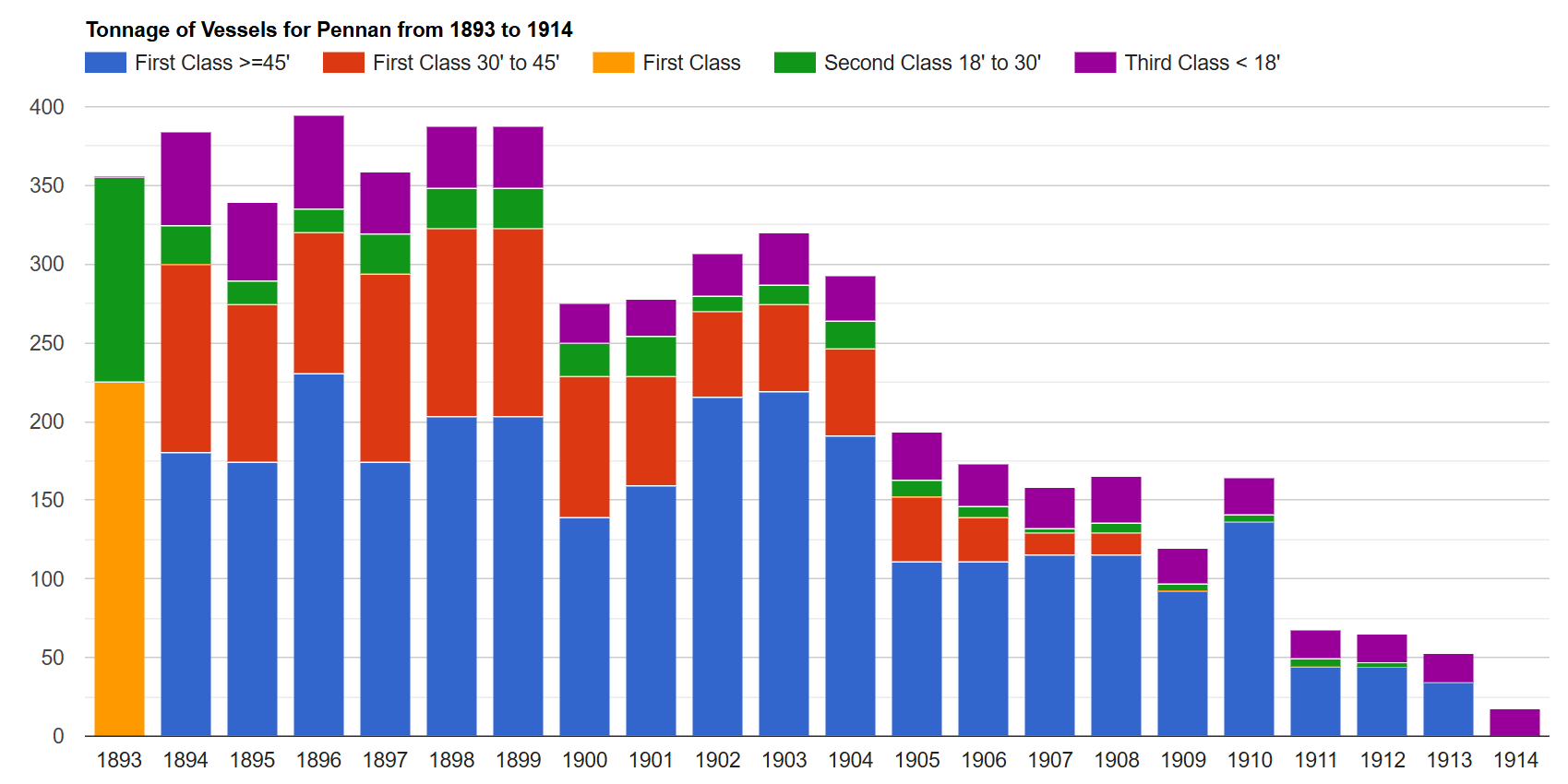
Tonnage of vessels

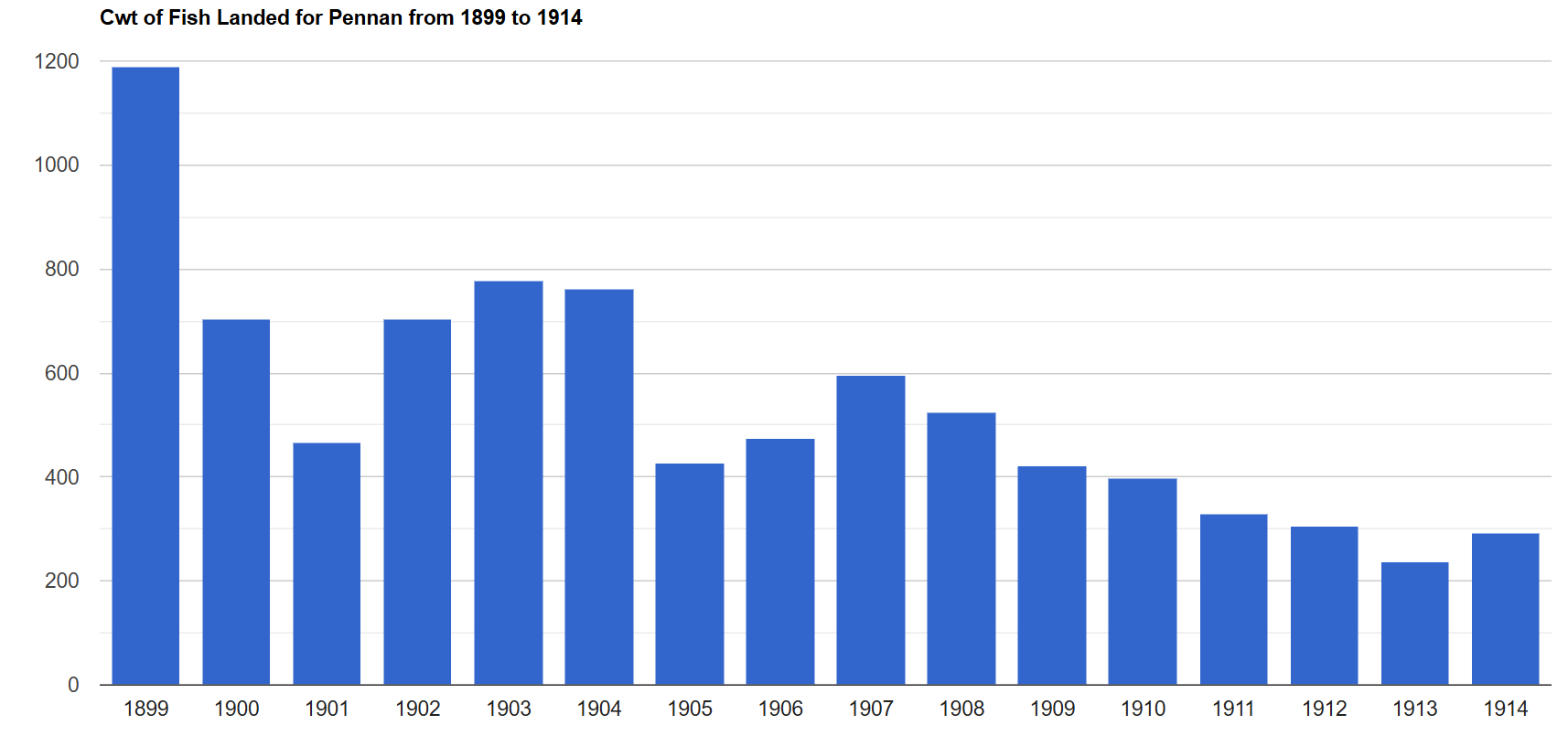
Cwt of fish landed

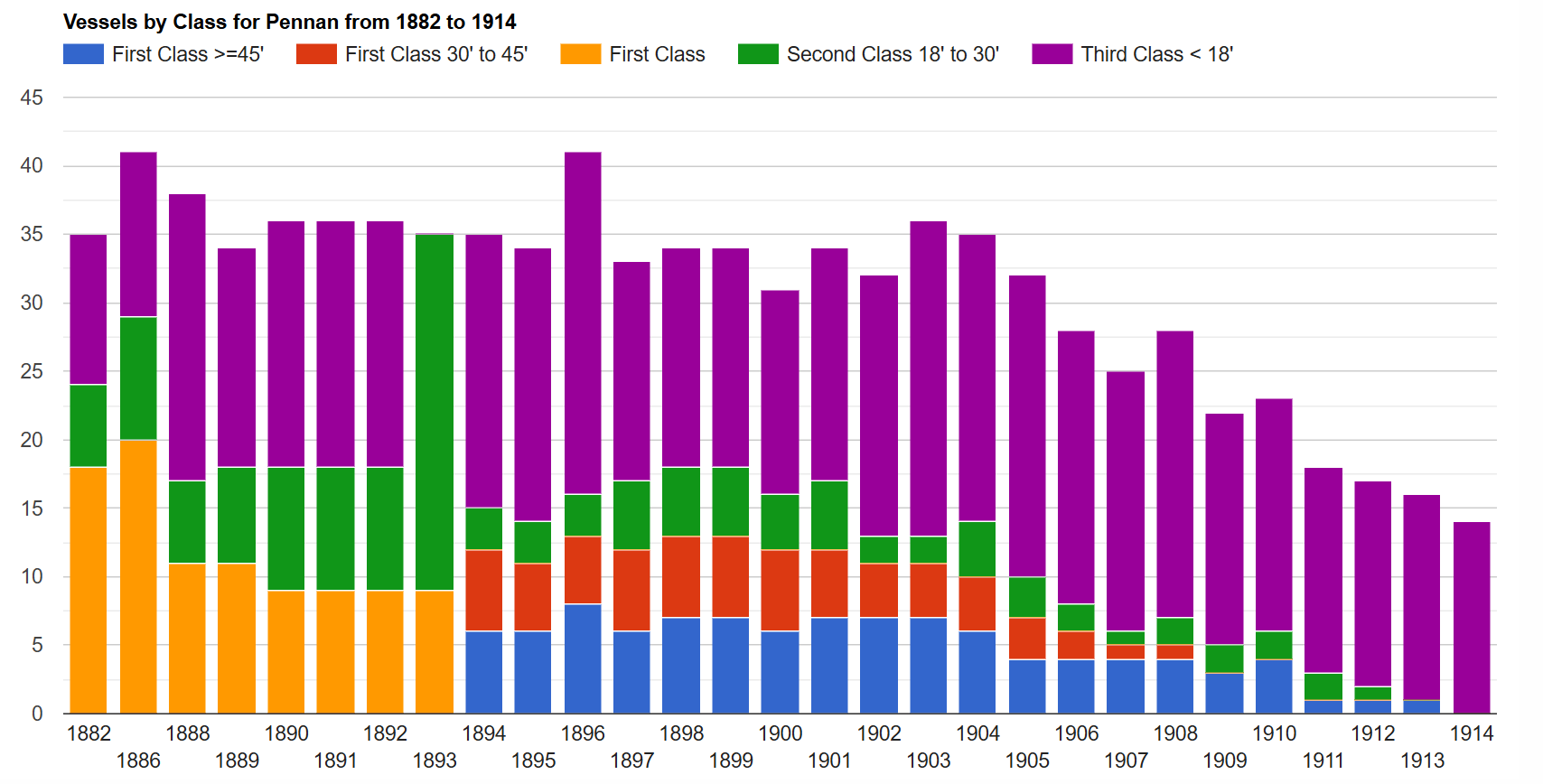
Vessels by class

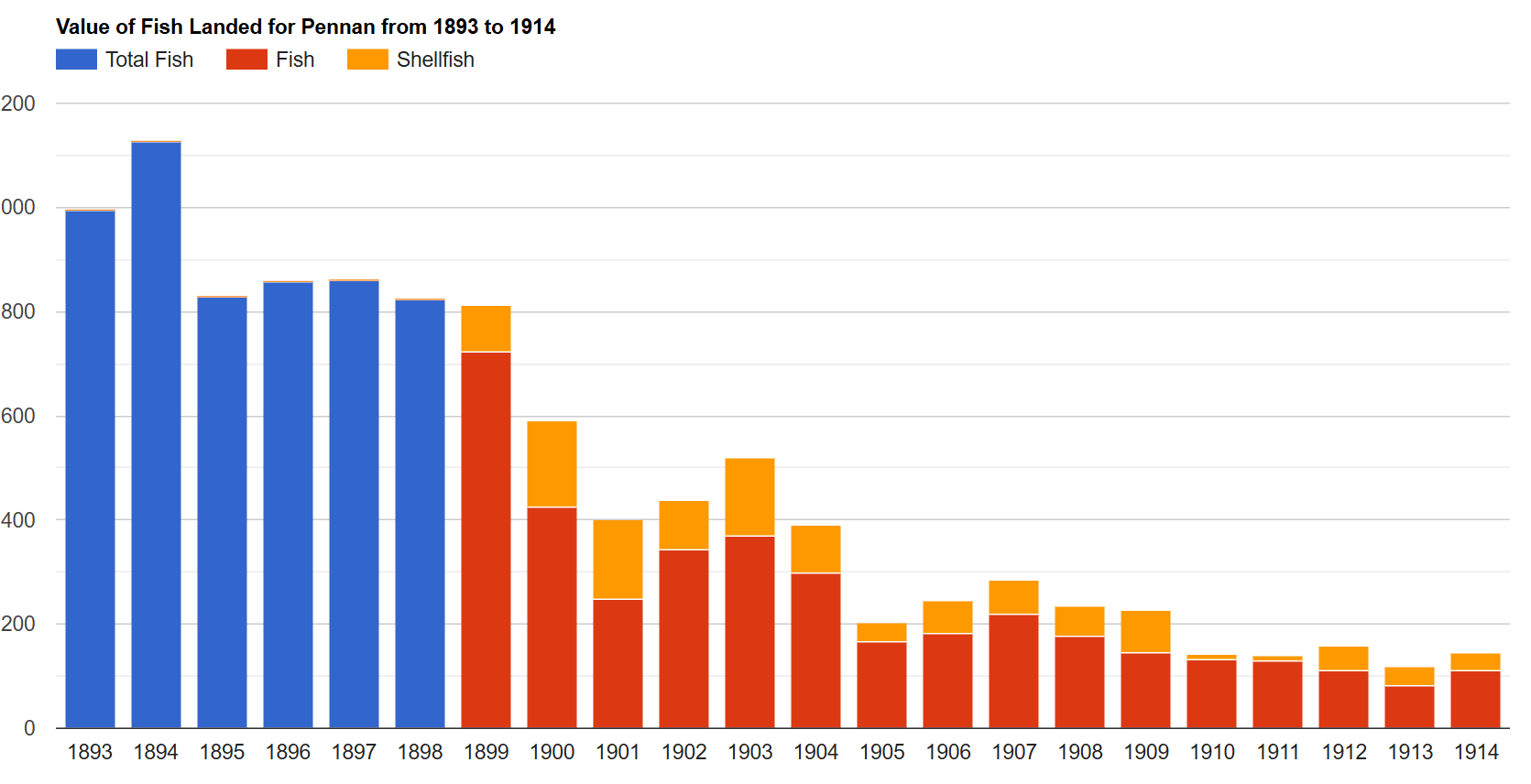
Value (£) of fish landed

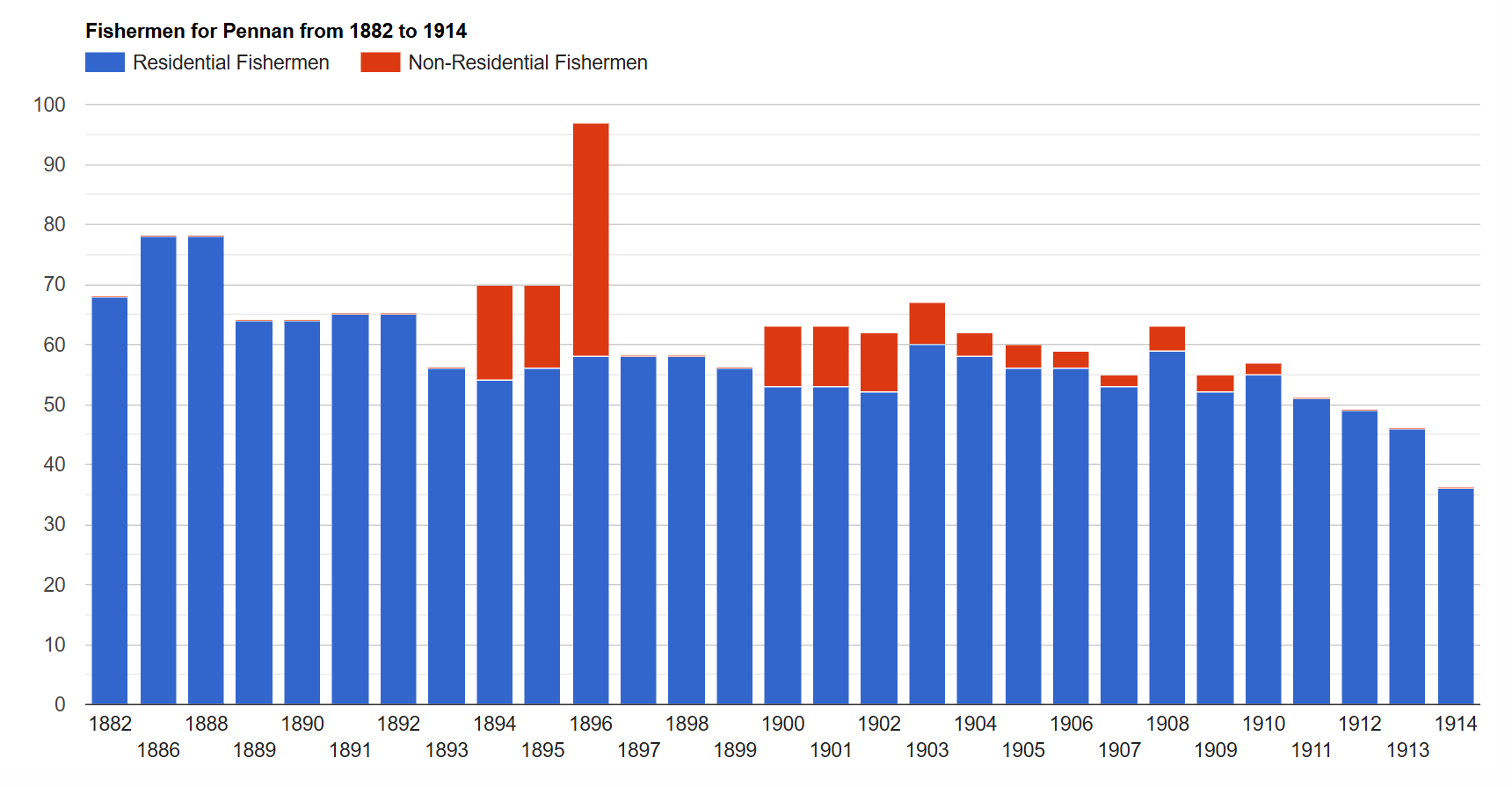
Fishermen

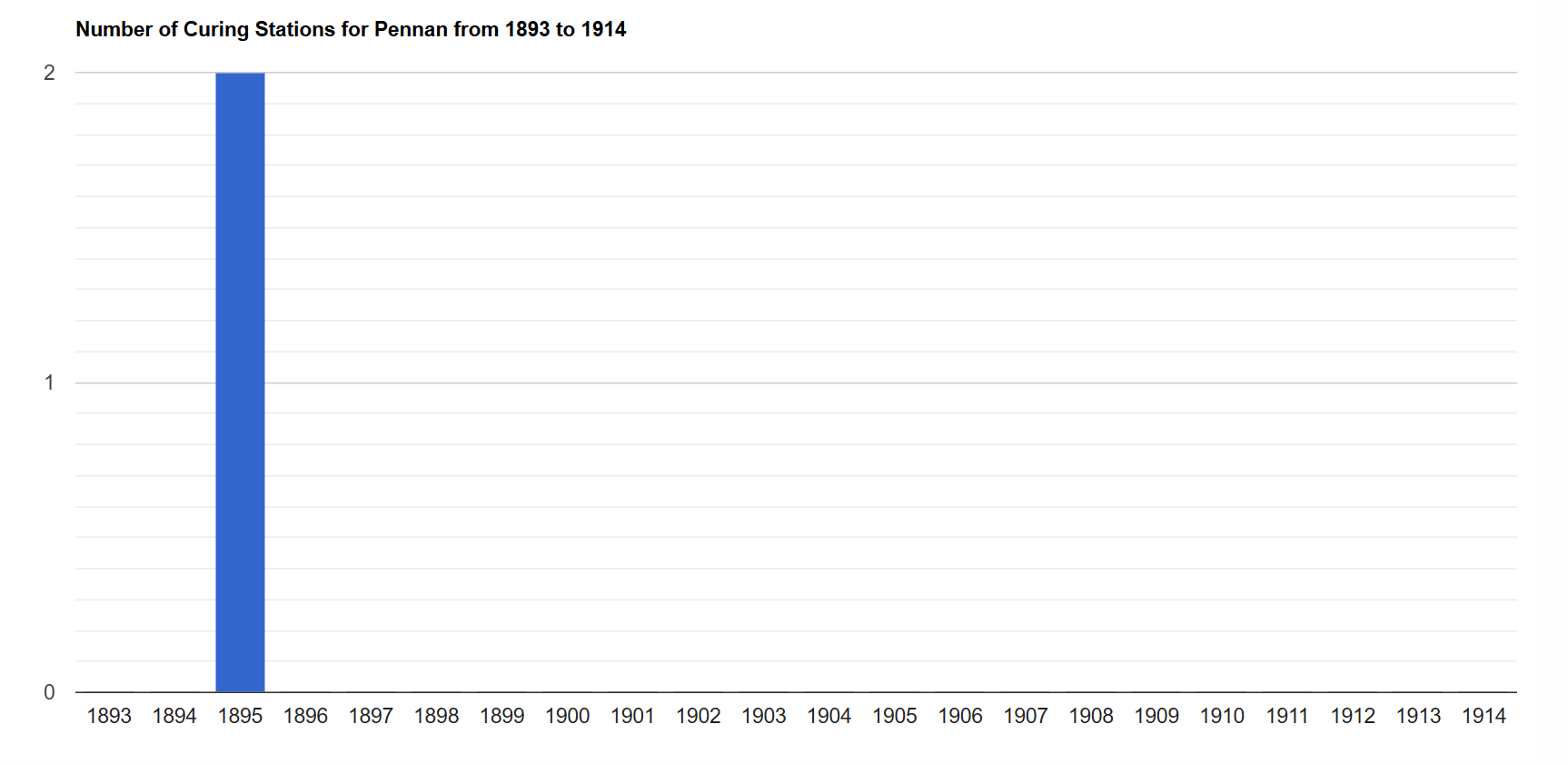
Number of curing stations
