= Mr. Love =

- Directed by: Roy Battersby
- Written by: Kenneth Eastaugh
- Produced by: Robin Douet; Susan Richards
- Starring: Barry Jackson; Maurice Denham; Marcia Warren
- Cinematography: Clive Tickner
- Edited by: Alan Cumner-Price
- Music by: Willy Russell
- Production companies: Enigma Productions; Goldcrest Films
- Distributed by: Warner Bros. Pictures
- Release date: 21 February 1986
- Running time: 91 minutes
- Country: United Kingdom
- Languages: English; Italian

Mr. Love is a 1986 British comedy film directed by Roy Battersby and starring Barry Jackson, Maurice Denham and Margaret Tyzack. It was made by Goldcrest Films.

Its budget was £486,000. (Another account says £1.1 million.) Goldcrest Films invested the £486,000 and received £330,000, recording a loss of £156,000.

== Plot ==
A mild-mannered gardener becomes a lovable legend in his town for his talent to romantically please every woman that fancies him.

== Cast ==
- Barry Jackson as Donald Lovelace
- Marcia Warren as Doris Lovelace
- Maurice Denham as Theo
- Margaret Tyzack as Pink Lady
- Linda Marlowe as Barbara
- Christina Collier as Esther
- Helen Cotterill as Lucy Nuttall
- Donal McCann as Leo
- Jacki Piper as Ida
- Patsy Byrne as Mrs Lunt
- Kay Stonham as Maggie Capstick
- Alan Starkey as Landau man
- Tony Melody as Ferris
- Lill Roughley as Housewife
- Julia Deakin as Melanie

== Production ==
The film was filmed at several notable locations in England, mainly in Southport, Merseyside and at Phoenix Cinema in East Finchley.

== Gallery ==
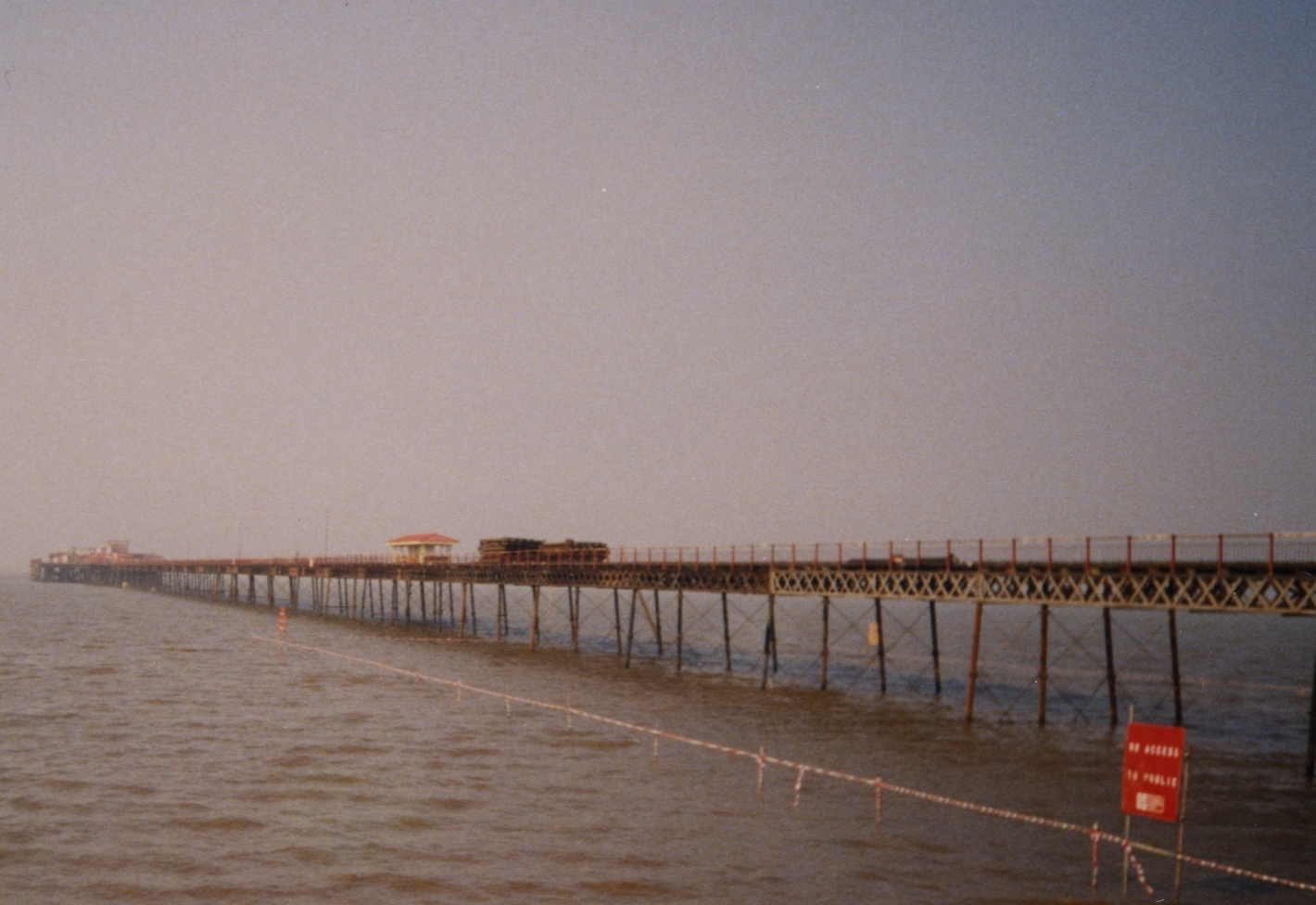
Southport pier (2000)

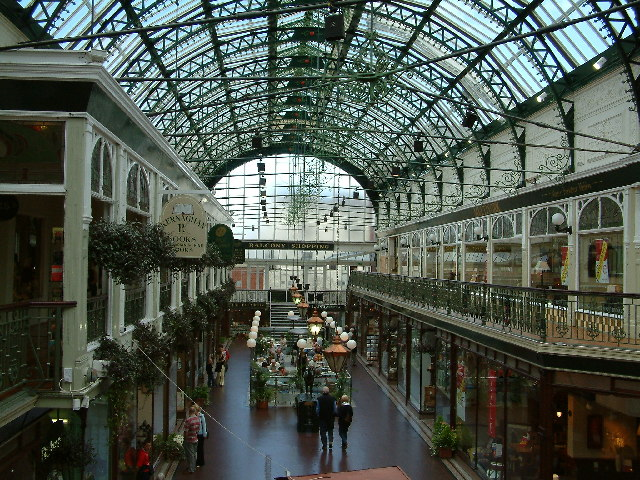
Wayfarers Arcade

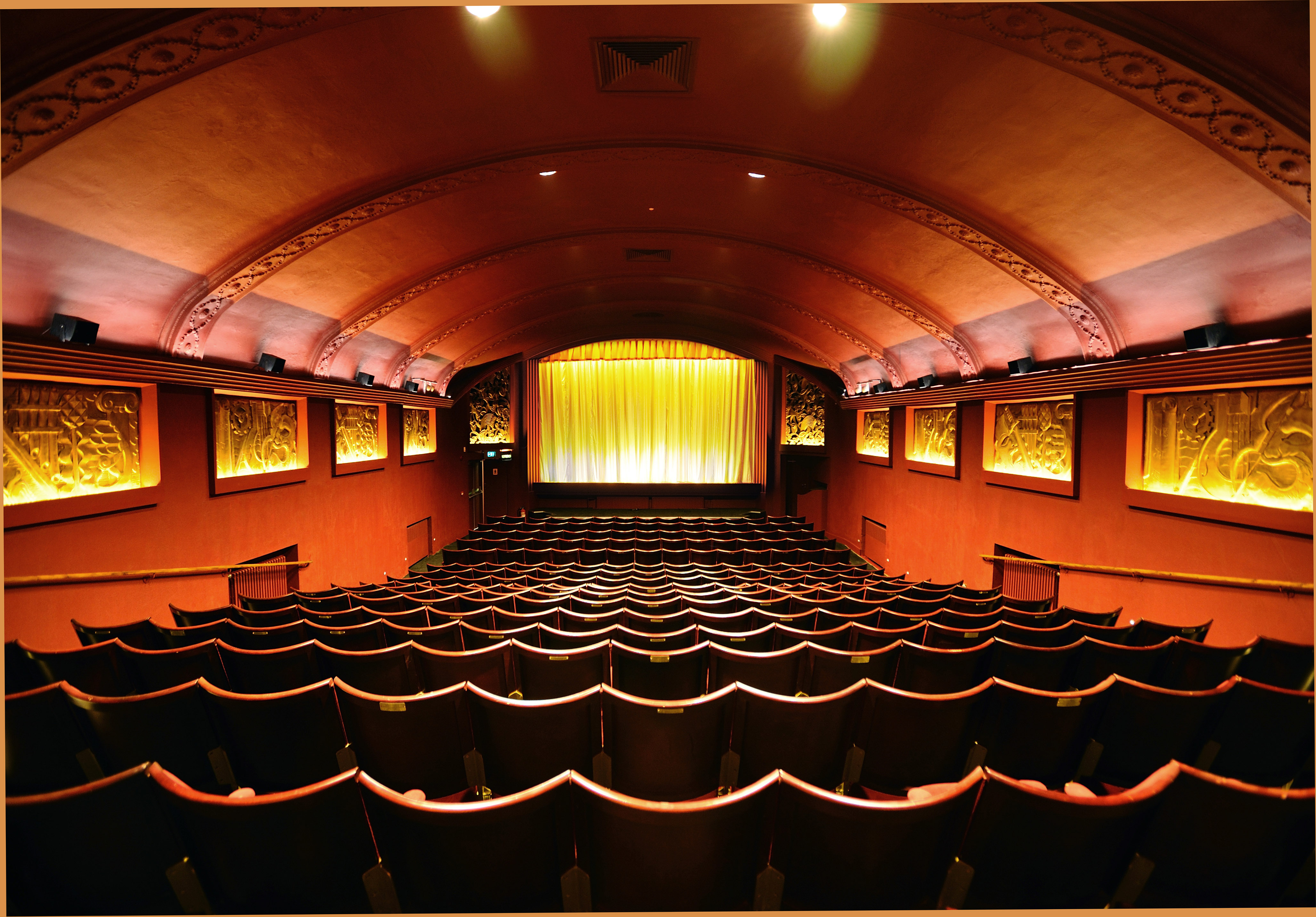
Phoenix Cinema

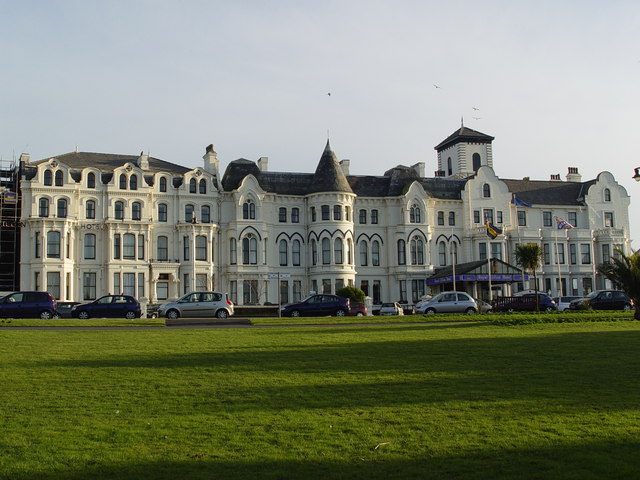
Royal Clifton Hotel
