= Amir Malin =

American film producer and executive

- Born: Tel Aviv, Israel
- Education: Brandeis University; Boston University School of Law
- Occupations: Film producer; film executive

Amir Malin is an American film producer and executive. He is the managing principal of Qualia Capital and formerly served as CEO of Artisan Entertainment and president of October Films.

== Early life and education ==
Malin was born in Tel Aviv, Israel, and grew up in Great Neck, New York. He graduated from Brandeis University and Boston University School of Law.

== Career ==
In 1982, Malin co-founded Cinecom Entertainment Group, an independent film company that produced films including A Room with a View and Stop Making Sense. Cinecom was sold to SBK Entertainment in 1989.

Malin was an early investor in independent distributor October Films upon its founding in 1992, and was named co-president. Highlights for the distributor during his tenure include the Academy Award-nominated films The War Room, Secrets & Lies, Breaking the Waves, as well as Lost Highway and The Last Seduction. Malin left in October 1997, prior to its acquisition by Universal Pictures.

On July 11, 1997, Malin was named co-president of Live Entertainment after it was acquired by Bain Capital, heading domestic and international film marketing and distribution, including theatrical, home video, and all ancillary markets. In 1998, Live Entertainment was renamed Artisan Entertainment. After seeing The Blair Witch Project at the 1999 Sundance Film Festival, they acquired worldwide rights to the film, including sequels, for $1.1 million. The film, which cost $60,000 to produce, would ultimately gross $248.6 million worldwide.

In June 2000, Malin was named CEO of Artisan. In that role, he continued to lead the restructuring of the company, from a video distributor to an independent film company focused on director-driven films such as The Blair Witch Project, Darren Aronofsky's Requiem for a Dream, Wim Wenders' Buena Vista Social Club, and Roman Polanski's The Ninth Gate. Artisan's catalogue included the films Terminator 2: Judgment Day, Dirty Dancing, Reservoir Dogs, First Blood, and It's a Wonderful Life. Malin also oversaw a deal with Marvel Enterprises to turn at least 15 Marvel superhero franchises into live-action features, television series, direct-to-video films, and internet projects. The agreement included Captain America, Black Panther, and Thor, and the first film produced under the joint venture was The Punisher. Malin left Artisan in 2003 following its merger with Lionsgate Entertainment.

Malin and Ken Schapiro co-founded media investment firm Qualia Capital in 2005, with Malin as managing principal. Qualia focuses on investments in media and entertainment, primarily in film, television, and music publishing. In 2006, Qualia purchased film and television libraries from Wagner/Cuban Companies and Gaylord Entertainment for a total of $100 million, gaining more than 200 films and 2,000 television episodes. The libraries included the films Primal Fear, Private Parts, Shine, and Like Water for Chocolate, and the television series Sex and the City and Hogan's Heroes. The company also owns the Pandora and Bing Crosby Productions libraries.

== Filmography ==
Year	Title	Role	Notes
1987	Swimming to Cambodia	Co-executive producer	
1987	Matewan	Executive producer	
1988	Miles from Home	Executive producer	
1989	Scenes from the Class Struggle in Beverly Hills	Executive producer	
2004	Dirty Dancing: Havana Nights	Executive producer	
2004	The Punisher	Executive producer	
2004	Stage Beauty	Executive producer	
