= Daniel Jewel =

English film producer and director

- Occupations: Film producer; director

Daniel Jewel is a London-based film producer and director. A graduate of Bristol University and Oxford University he has worked with British film directors such as Stephen Poliakoff, Charles Sturridge and Brian Gilbert. In 2006 he produced the play Allegiance at the Edinburgh Festival, which starred Michael Fassbender as the Irish leader, Michael Collins. The play was directed by Brian Gilbert. In 2007 he produced and directed two films for Channel 4 about the shisha smoking cafes of London's Arabic quarter. In 2008 he directed two documentaries for Al Gore's Current TV. In late 2008 his production company, Third Man Films produced Sidney Turtlebaum starring Derek Jacobi and Rupert Evans which The Times called a "Masterpiece" and was nominated for a British Independent Film Award and short-listed for an Academy Award in 2010.
