= Vice Versa (1988 film) =

1988 film by Brian Gilbert

- Theatrical release poster
- Directed by: Brian Gilbert
- Written by: Dick Clement; Ian La Frenais
- Based on: Vice Versa by F. Anstey
- Produced by: Dick Clement; Ian La Frenais
- Starring: Judge Reinhold; Fred Savage; Swoosie Kurtz
- Cinematography: King Baggot
- Edited by: David Garfield
- Music by: David Shire
- Distributed by: Columbia Pictures
- Release date: March 11, 1988
- Running time: 98 minutes
- Country: United States
- Language: English
- Budget: $10 million
- Box office: $13.7 million

Vice Versa is a 1988 American fantasy comedy film directed by Brian Gilbert and starring Judge Reinhold and Fred Savage. It is the fourth film adaptation of F. Anstey's 1882 novel of the same name, following the British films released in 1916, 1937 and 1948.

== Plot ==
In Thailand, a pair of thieves steal an ancient skull from a Buddhist monastery.

Marshall Seymour is vice president of a Chicago department store. He is divorced and has an 11-year-old son named Charlie, for whom he has little time. He and his girlfriend Sam visit Thailand to purchase exotic merchandise. At the same time, an art thief named Turk must find a way to smuggle an ornate skull out of the country. He places it with one of Marshall's purchases so that he and his accomplice Lillian Brookmeyer can make a switch later.

When Marshall returns home, he takes Charlie for a few days while his mother Robyn and stepfather Cliff are on vacation. While holding the skull, they wish that they could be in each other's bodies. The skull possesses magical powers, and they suddenly find that they have switched bodies.

The two realize they must live out their lives as each other. Marshall heads to school, while Charlie assumes his father's role as a vice president.

Marshall and Charlie visit the museum and talk with Professor Kerschner, who explains the true nature of the skull and wishes to show it to a lama before returning it to them. Robyn arrives home earlier than expected and is furious at the sight of Marshall (as Charlie) drinking a martini.

After failing to reacquire the skull, the thieves embark on a mission to steal it. Charlie learns from Marshall's boss Avery that he has called a meeting to pull the plug on Marshall's business. He collects Marshall at school and, after purchasing a device that will allow them to communicate with each other, Marshall listens in on the boardroom meeting and instructs Charlie on what to say. However, Turk kidnaps Marshall, leaving Charlie to fend for himself in the boardroom.

With Turk and Lillian holding Marshall for ransom, Charlie retrieves the skull from the lama. He then exchanges it for Marshall. However, he and Charlie rush to reacquire the skull so that they can switch themselves back. They catch the thieves just after they have accidentally switched bodies, and they take the skull back, leaving Turk and Lillian in their new bodies as punishment.

The police arrest Charlie for possible kidnapping, so Cliff posts his bail. Marshall asks Sam to take him home so that he can give Charlie a present. On the way, he proposes marriage.

Charlie and Marshall touch the skull, switching back into their own bodies. Marshall then goes to see Sam while Charlie listens to their conversation about the proposal. Though initially caught off guard, Marshall relents and embraces the proposal that Charlie made for him.

== Cast ==
- Judge Reinhold as Marshall Seymour/Charlie Seymour
- Fred Savage as Charlie Seymour/Marshall Seymour
- Corinne Bohrer as Sam
- Swoosie Kurtz as Lillian Brookmeyer/Turk (Credited as Tina)
- David Proval as Turk/Lillian Brookmeyer
- Jane Kaczmarek as Robyn Seymour
- William Prince as Stratford Avery
- Gloria Gifford as Marcie
- Beverly Archer as Jane Luttrell
- Harry Murphy as Larry
- Kevin O'Rourke as Brad
- Richard Kind as Floyd
- Chip Lucia as Cliff
- Elya Baskin as Professor Kerschner
- James Hong as Kwo
- Ajay Naidu as Dale Ferriera
- Jane Lynch as Ms. Lindstrom
- Jason Late as Erie
- P.J. Brown as Hockey Coach
- Steve Assad as Waiter
- Bernie Landis as Santa Claus
- Malice as themselves

== Reception ==
The film received mixed reviews. Roger Ebert was its most ardent champion; his review in the Chicago Sun-Times opened thus:

Who would have guessed it? Who would have been able to predict that the plot of one of last year's worst movies could produce one of this year's most endearing comedies? Here at last is proof that the right actors can make anything funny, or perhaps it is proof that the wrong actors cannot. The name of the movie is "Vice Versa," and when they made it last year it was called "Like Father, Like Son."

Movie historian Leonard Maltin seemed to agree, giving the picture 3 out of a possible 4 stars: "Not up to Big, but better than it ought to be; both Judge Reinhold and Fred Savage appear to be having a whale of a time in their roles."

Less enthusiastic was Michael Wilmington of the Los Angeles Times, who wrote that it "may be a better film than Like Father, Like Son, largely because of the direction and Savage's performance, but it's still a disappointment. British director Brian Gilbert showed tremendous talent in his 1985 Sharma and Beyond, which he also wrote. Here, producer-writers Ian La Fresnais and Dick Clement (Otley, Water) give us mostly a collection of obvious gags, traipsing wheezingly from one point to another." He added:

"Vice Versa" has its moments. Occasionally there's a genuinely funny scene, or an affecting interchange between Reinhold and Savage. Yet the invention in either of these father-son switch movies is dubious. As high concept or low comedy, they're movies probably only a mother could love.

Janet Maslin of The New York Times wrote that "Luck doesn't get any worse than it has for Vice Versa, the twin of an identically plotted film released only a few months previously. Originality isn't a factor for either this or Like Father, Like Son, since they both owe a good deal to the earlier Freaky Friday, but timeliness undoubtedly is. All things being equal, neither of these films is appreciably better than the other; the difference isn't one of quality but of style. Like Father, Like Son had Dudley Moore, who brought a certain sly sophistication to the role of a grown man with the mind of a small boy, while Vice Versa, which opens today at Loews Astor Plaza and other theaters, has Judge Reinhold, who concentrates more on the innocent silliness of the situation. Both of them have found gentle humor in the plight of a grown man sent off to junior high school while his carefree, irresponsible, career-wrecking son fills in for him on the job."

Internationally, Derek Malcolm wrote in The Guardian that "the film opens well, since father has divorced his wife and has little time for his son, making the sudden transformation the more piquant. And Reinhold plays himself as a boy with considerable mimic skill. But the film, though scripted by Dick Clement and Ian La Frenais, never strays very far from orthodox Hollywood comedy, though put together with enough skill to be fairly watchable throughout." David Robinson of the London newspaper The Times wrote:

The script, by Ian La Frenais and Dick Clement, develops some amusing variations on the story, like the infant father's chagrin at watching his mistress lavish her affections on the sexually unresponding grown-up child; and at being handed over to the smothering custody of the woman with whom, as husband, he was unable to live. A sub-plot involving a pair of comic villains, trying to steal the talisman that started the trouble, however, wanders rather aimlessly. The real pleasure of the picture lies in the central performances of the role-switchers. Fred Savage is a likeable little boy, not handicapped by his physical cuteness, and turning in a good comic performance as the fussy, peremptory and Martini-guzzling cut-down father. Judge Reinhold is as amusing as a daffy impulsive 11-year-old in a matured body, alternately delighting in the unaccustomed privileges (as well as the body hair) of adulthood, and tearfully terrified by the duties.

The film has a score of 50% on Rotten Tomatoes from 16 critics. It was a box office bomb, grossing just $13,664,060 in the United States during its theatrical run.

== See also ==
- Body swap appearances in media (film)
