= The Yellow Cake Revue =

Musical by Peter Maxwell Davies

- by Peter Maxwell Davies
- Language: English
- Composed: 1980
- Performed: June 1980: Stromness, Orkney

The Yellow Cake Revue is a musical composition for piano and voice. Peter Maxwell Davies composed the piece in 1980. He first performed it at the Stromness Hotel, in Stromness, Orkney, as part of the 1980 St Magnus Festival—a summer arts festival that he co-founded in 1977. English actress Eleanor Bron recited the spoken word portions for the debut performance.

== Theme ==
The Yellow Cake Revue concerns the threat that a uranium mine might be constructed near Stromness, a town on the largest island in Orkney, Scotland. Yellowcake, the revue's namesake, is the form of uranium that was discovered on the island. When a geological survey revealed the yellowcake deposits in the early 1970s, the South of Scotland Electricity Board wanted to mine the uranium to fuel a nuclear power plant. Once the islanders understood the ramifications of solution mining the island, they (and the Orkney Islands Council) opposed the initiative unilaterally. Davies was moved to write The Yellow Cake Revue after a public examiner's report advised the Secretary of State for Scotland to deny the SSEB's request to mine. Although he was English, Davies was an Orkney resident from 1971 until his death in 2016.

== Structure ==
The work is a sequence of cabaret songs and recitations, with two interludes for piano. The first interlude, "Farewell to Stromness", has become one of Davies's most popular pieces, and has been arranged for various instruments. "Yesnaby Ground", too, is often performed as an independent piece.

1. Tourist Board Song: O come to sunny Warbeth
2. Patriotic Song: You've heard of the man with the pace-maker
3. Piano Interlude: Farewell to Stromness
4. Recitation – Nuclear Job Interview 1: The Security Guard
5. Uranium's Daughters' Dance: They said, when they'd extracted the uranium from the ore
6. Recitation – Nuclear Job Interview 2: The Truck Driver
7. Atlantic Breezes
8. Recitation – Nuclear Job Interview 3: The Mental Healthworker
9. Piano Interlude: Yesnaby Ground
10. The Tourist Song: Have you heard of the terrorist suicide squad?
11. The Triumph of the Cockroach: As earthquakes subsided

=== Farewell to Stromness ===
"Farewell to Stromness" is the single most famous piece of music from the composition, and is Davies's best-known and most often performed work. Originally written as a piano solo, it has been transcribed for several solo instruments, most notably guitar. Words were added to the tune by Ray Connolly for the 1983 Channel Four film Forever Young. The sole representative of Davies's output in the Classic FM Hall of Fame, "Farewell to Stromness" was the subject of the BBC Radio 4 programme Soul Music on 31 July 2019.
