= Local Hero (film) =

1983 film by Bill Forsyth

- Theatrical release poster
- Directed by: Bill Forsyth
- Written by: Bill Forsyth
- Produced by: David Puttnam
- Starring: Peter Riegert; Denis Lawson; Fulton Mackay; Burt Lancaster
- Cinematography: Chris Menges
- Edited by: Michael Bradsell
- Music by: Mark Knopfler
- Production company: Goldcrest Films
- Distributed by: 20th Century Fox (United Kingdom); Warner Bros. Pictures (United States)
- Release dates: 17 February 1983 (New York City); 17 March 1983 (London); 29 April 1983 (UK)
- Running time: 111 minutes
- Country: United Kingdom
- Language: English
- Budget: £3 million or £2.6 million
- Box office: $5.9 million (US)

Local Hero is a 1983 British comedy-drama film written and directed by Bill Forsyth and produced by David Puttnam. It stars Peter Riegert, Burt Lancaster, Denis Lawson, Peter Capaldi, and Fulton Mackay. Riegert plays an American oil company representative who is sent to a village on the west coast of Scotland to purchase the town and surrounding property to build an oil refinery. The musical score was composed by Mark Knopfler.

The film premiered on 17 February 1983. It received acclaim, and holds a 100% rating on Rotten Tomatoes. At the 37th British Academy Film Awards, the film was nominated for seven BAFTA Awards and won Best Direction for Forsyth. In 1999, the British Film Institute ranked the film as one of the Top 100 British films of the 20th century. A stage musical adaptation, written by Forsyth and Knopfler, premiered in 2019.

== Plot ==
"Mac" MacIntyre is an aspiring executive working for Knox Oil and Gas in Houston, Texas. Crabbe, a senior Knox executive, chooses Mac because of his Scottish-sounding surname and because he handled Mexico well the previous year to acquire Ferness, a village in the Scottish Highlands, to make way for a refinery. Mac, actually of Hungarian extraction, is apprehensive about the assignment, complaining to a co-worker that he would rather handle business over the phone and via telex. Felix Happer, the company's eccentric owner and avid amateur astronomer, tells Mac to watch the sky and to notify him immediately if he sees anything unusual.

Arriving in Scotland, Mac teams up with local Knox representative Danny Oldsen. When they visit a Knox research facility in Aberdeen, Dr. Geddes explains the plan to replace Ferness with the refinery. They also meet marine researcher Marina. Mac spends several days in Ferness, gradually adapting to the slower-paced life and getting to know the residents, most notably hotel owner and accountant Gordon Urquhart and his wife Stella. Mac becomes more and more ambivalent as he presses to close the deal that will demolish the village he has come to love. The villagers are tired of their hard life and are more than eager to sell, though they feign indifference to induce a larger offer. Mac receives encouragement from an unlikely source: Victor, a capitalistic Soviet fishing boat captain who regularly visits his friends in Ferness and checks on his investment portfolio, managed by Gordon.

Danny befriends Marina, who is under the impression that the company is planning to build a marine research centre at Ferness. While watching some grey seals, Danny mentions that sailors used to believe they were mermaids. Marina tells him the sailors were wrong. Later Danny discovers that Marina, who seems more at home in the water than on land, has webbed toes.

As the deal nears completion, Gordon discovers that Ben Knox, an old beachcomber who lives in a driftwood shack on the shore, owns the beach through a grant from the Lord of the Isles to his ancestor. After being offered £750,000, Ben picks up some sand and offers to sell for the same number of pound notes as he has grains of sand in his hand. A suspicious MacIntyre declines, only to be told there could not have been more than ten thousand grains. He tries everything to entice Ben to sell, even offering enough money to buy a similar stretch of any other beach in the world, but Ben is not interested.

Happer arrives just in time by helicopter to unknowingly forestall an ugly confrontation between some of the villagers and Ben. When Mac informs him of the snag in the proceedings, he decides to negotiate personally with Ben and, in the process, discovers a kindred spirit. Happer opts to relocate the refinery offshore and set up an astronomical observatory instead. Danny brings up Marina's dream of an oceanographic research facility and suggests combining the two into the "Happer Institute", an idea that Happer enthusiastically embraces. Sent back home to implement the changes, MacIntyre reluctantly returns to his apartment in Houston. He pulls from his pocket pebbles and shells and spreads them out on the work surface. The local phone box in Ferness starts ringing.

== Cast ==
- Peter Riegert as "Mac" MacIntyre
- Burt Lancaster as Felix Happer
- Fulton Mackay as Ben Knox
- Denis Lawson as Gordon Urquhart
- Peter Capaldi as Danny Oldsen
- Jenny Seagrove as Marina
- Jennifer Black as Stella Urquhart
- Norman Chancer as Moritz
- Rikki Fulton as Geddes
- Alex Norton as Watt
- Christopher Rozycki as Victor
- Christopher Asante as Reverend Macpherson
- John Gordon Sinclair as Ricky
- Caroline Guthrie as Pauline
- John M. Jackson as Cal (as John Jackson)
- Jimmy Yuill as Iain
- Tam Dean Burn as Roddy
- Sandra Voe as Mrs Fraser
- Jonathan Watson as Jonathan

== Production ==
=== Development ===
Warner Bros. Pictures and Goldcrest Films originally declined to fund Local Hero. However, when Puttnam won a BAFTA for Chariots of Fire in 1982, Goldcrest agreed to finance the entire film. Warner Bros. agreed to pay $1.5 million for US rights. The character of Gordon Urquhart was partly inspired by Seumas McSporran and by Shetland Islands Council chief executive Ian Clark.

=== Casting ===
Puttnam always wanted Burt Lancaster to play Happer but the casting proved problematic because the Hollywood star wanted his $2 million salary, which was almost a third of the film's entire budget. Upon learning of Lancaster's potential involvement in the project, Warner Bros. Pictures offered Puttnam a US distribution deal and provided the additional funding to secure Lancaster. After negotiations, Puttnam ended up having an additional $200,000 in the film's budget. He later remarked in an interview that "big stars are not a liability, they are an asset!"

Michael Douglas and Henry Winkler were both pursued by Bill Forsyth for the role of MacIntyre (which ultimately went to Peter Riegert).

=== Filming ===
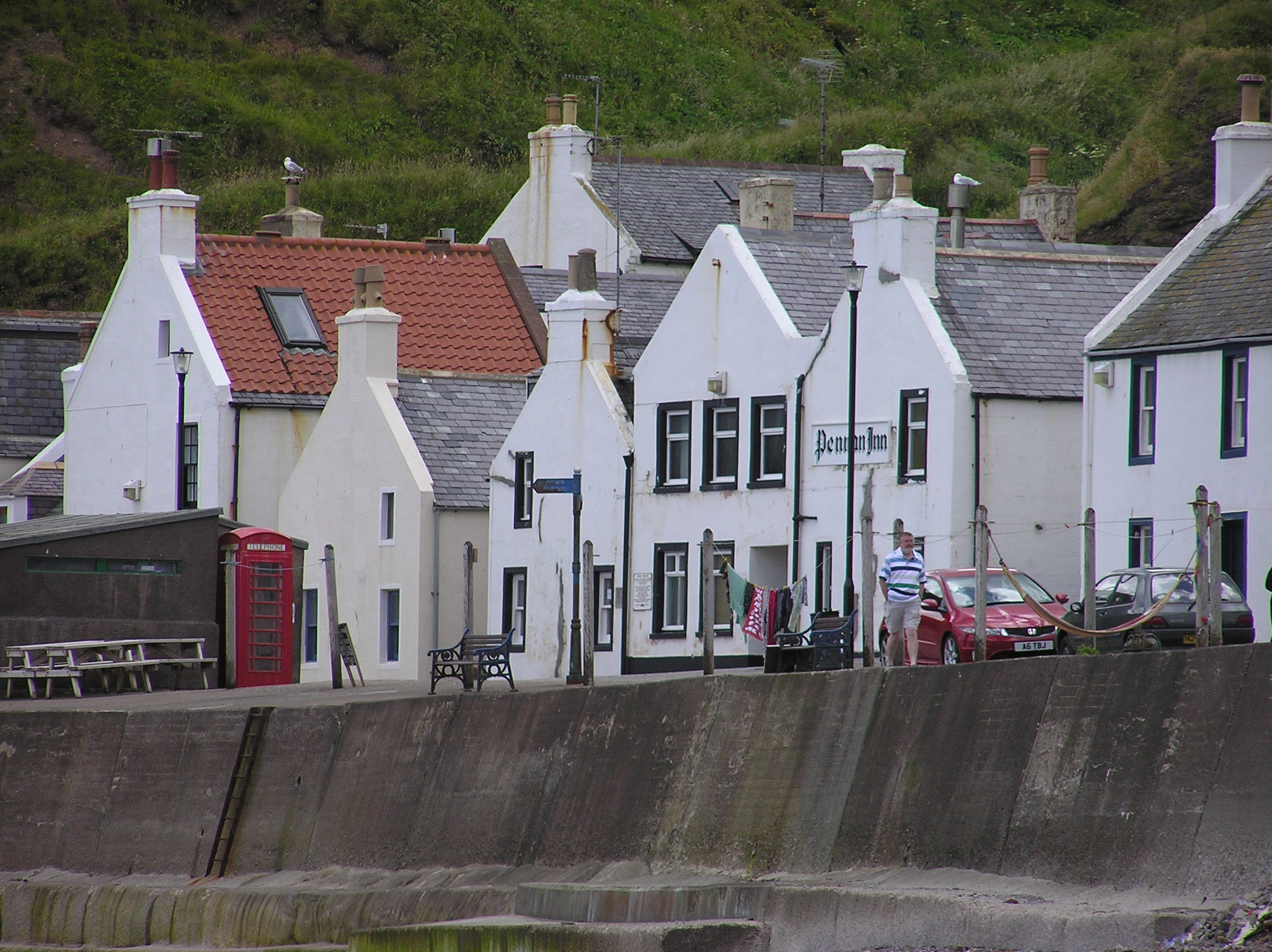
Pennan, Aberdeenshire, which featured as the fictional village of Ferness

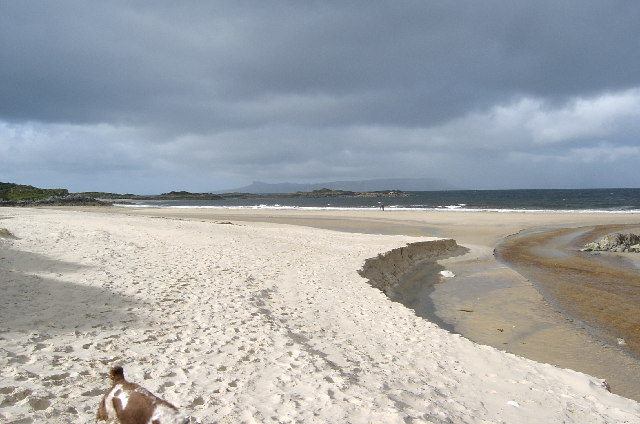
Camusdarach, Morar, near Mallaig, Highland, as the beach at Ferness

Local Hero was filmed in several locations around Scotland. Most of the Ferness village scenes were filmed in Pennan on the Aberdeenshire coast, and most of the beach scenes at Morar and Arisaig on the west coast.

- Aberdeenshire
- Arisaig, Highland,
- The Ship Inn, Banff (interior bar scenes)
- Ben Nevis Distillery, Fort William, Highland
- Camusdarach Sands, Camusdarach, Morar, Mallaig, Highland (Ferness, beach scenes, including external scene of Ferness church, using a mock-up of Our Lady of the Braes church – see below – specially constructed beside the beach)
- Fort William, Highland
- Highlands
- Hilton, Highland (Ferness, village hall ceilidh)
- Lyndon B. Johnson Space Center, 2101 NASA Road, Houston, Texas, US (Knox Oil testing lab)
- Loch Eil, Highland
- Lochaber, Highland
- Lochailort, Highland (Ferness hotel, internal shots)
- Loch Tarff, Fort Augustus, Highland (fog and rabbit scenes)
- Mallaig, Highland
- Moidart, Highland (road scenes for drive to Ferness – A861 descent to Loch Moidart and descent to Inversanda Bay)
- JPMorgan Chase Tower, formerly Texas Commerce Tower, 600 Travis St., Houston, Texas, US (Knox Oil headquarters exteriors)
- Pennzoil Place, 711 Louisiana St. Houston, Texas, US (Knox Oil headquarters interiors)
- Our Lady of the Braes Roman Catholic Church, Polnish, Highland (Ferness, village church, internal scenes)
- Pennan, Aberdeenshire (Ferness, includes red phone box)
- Pole of Itlaw, Aberdeenshire (Ferness, village shop)

=== Soundtrack ===
The film's soundtrack was written and produced by Mark Knopfler of Dire Straits. This has led to the popularity of the film with fans of the band, and Knopfler has since performed an arrangement of "Going Home (Theme of the Local Hero)" as an encore at many of his concerts. This tune borrows some melodic riffs from traditional Scottish songs. In his review of the album for AllMusic, William Ruhlmann wrote:

Dire Straits leader Mark Knopfler's intricate, introspective fingerpicked guitar stylings make a perfect musical complement to the wistful tone of Bill Forsyth's comedy film, Local Hero ... The low-key music picks up traces of Scottish music, but most of it just sounds like Dire Straits doing instrumentals, especially the recurring theme, one of Knopfler's more memorable melodies.

Knopfler re-recorded the theme with fellow guitarists including Bruce Springsteen, Brian May and Jeff Beck (credited as 'Mark Knopfler's Guitar Heroes') in aid of Teenage Cancer Trust in March 2024. The track peaked at #18 on the UK singles chart.

Gerry Rafferty provided the vocals for "The Way It Always Starts" on the soundtrack. The album was certified a BPI silver record.

== Critical response ==
The film received strongly positive reviews, except in Scotland.

In his Chicago Sun-Times review, Roger Ebert gave the film his highest four stars, calling it "a small film to treasure". He gave particular praise to writer-director Bill Forsyth for his abilities as a storyteller.

What makes this material really work is the low-key approach of the writer-director, Bill Forsyth, who also made the charming Gregory's Girl and has the patience to let his characters gradually reveal themselves to the camera. He never hurries, and as a result, Local Hero never drags: Nothing is more absorbing than human personalities, developed with love and humor. Some of the payoffs in this film are sly and subtle, and others generate big laughs. Forsyth's big scenes are his little ones, including a heartfelt, whisky-soaked talk between the American and the innkeeper, and a scene where the visitors walk on the beach and talk about the meaning of life. By the time Burt Lancaster reappears at the end of the film, to personally handle the negotiations with old Ben, Local Hero could hardly have anything but a happy ending.

James Berardinelli gave the film three and a half stars out of four, calling it "a fragment of cinematic whimsy—a genial dramatic comedy that defies both our expectations and those of the characters". Berardinelli also focused on Forsyth's abilities as a storyteller, noting that the director "finds the perfect tone for this not-quite-a-fairy-tale set in a quaint seaside Scottish village named Ferness. By injecting a little (but not too much) magical realism into the mix, Forsyth leavens his pro-environmental message to the point that those not looking for it might not be conscious of its presence." Berardinelli concluded that Local Hero represents "the best kind of light fare: a motion picture that offers a helping of substance to go along with an otherwise frothy and undemanding main course".

The New York Times critic Janet Maslin wrote, "Genuine fairy tales are rare; so is film-making that is thoroughly original in an unobtrusive way. Bill Forsyth's quirky disarming Local Hero is both." Maslin concluded:

Local Hero is a funny movie, but it's more apt to induce chuckles than knee-slapping. Like Gregory's Girl, it demonstrates Mr. Forsyth's uncanny ability for making an audience sense that something magical is going on, even if that something isn't easily explained.

In Variety magazine, film critic Todd McCarthy wrote, "After making the grade internationally with the sleeper hit, Gregory's Girl, Scottish writer-director Bill Forsyth has broken the sophomore sesh jinx the only way he could, by making an even better film ... Given a larger canvas, director Forsyth has in no way attempted to overreach himself or the material, keeping things modest and intimate throughout, but displaying a very acute sense of comic insight."

Almar Haflidason called Local Hero "a wry film that slowly slips under the skin to surprising effect" in BBC Home. Haflidason concludes, "Once over, the mood of the film hits home and a longing develops to visit once again the characters of this warm and deceptively slight comedy."

For Movie Gazette, Gary Panton described the film as a "magical, intelligent comedy". Panton praised the cinematography as "little short of amazing" and that Local Hero was "Bill Forsyth's finest work of all, this is a perfect film."

During his 2000 campaign for the presidency, US Vice-president Al Gore told Oprah Winfrey in an interview that Local Hero was his favourite film.

On Rotten Tomatoes, the film received a 100% rating based on 39 reviews, with an average rating of 8.8/10. The site's consensus reads: "A charmingly low-key character study brought to life by a tremendously talented cast, Local Hero is as humorous as it is heartwarming". On Metacritic, the film has a score of 83 out of 100, based on reviews from 17 critics.

Some Scottish critics were less enthusiastic about the film, pointing out that it repeated and reinforced long-established cinematic representations of Scotland and the Scots and perpetuated a comforting but misleading narrative about Scotland's relationship with international capitalism. The Glasgow Women and Film Collective questioned what it saw as the film's male-oriented narrative about innocence and power and the marginal roles it accorded to women.

== Box office ==
Local Hero earned $5,895,761 in total gross sales in the United States. It earned distributors gross of £487,437 in the UK.

Goldcrest Films invested £2,551,000 in the film and received £3,290,000, earning them a profit of £739,000.

== Accolades ==
Year	Award	Category	Nominee	Result
1984	British Academy Film Awards	Best Actor in a Supporting Role	Burt Lancaster	Nominated
1984	British Academy Film Awards	Best Cinematography	Chris Menges	Nominated
1984	British Academy Film Awards	Best Direction	Bill Forsyth	Won
1984	British Academy Film Awards	Best Editing	Michael Bradsell	Nominated
1984	British Academy Film Awards	Best Film	David Puttnam	Nominated
1984	British Academy Film Awards	Best Film Music	Mark Knopfler	Nominated
1984	British Academy Film Awards	Best Original Screenplay	Bill Forsyth	Nominated
1983	National Board of Review Awards	Top Ten Films	Local Hero	Won
1984	National Society of Film Critics Awards	Best Screenplay	Bill Forsyth	Won
1984	New York Film Critics Circle Awards	Best Screenplay	Bill Forsyth	Won

== Legacy ==
The minor planet 7345 Happer is named after Lancaster's character in the film and his quest to have a comet named after him.

The song "Going Home: The Theme of the Local Hero", from the soundtrack, is used as the walk-on music for Newcastle United F.C. at St James' Park. Mark Knopfler, the composer, grew up in Newcastle and is a fan of the club.

The same song is used at Tranmere Rovers F.C. following the final whistle of the match. This is due to the longstanding links between Birkenhead and Texas.

This film was inspiration for the television series Northern Exposure, as it was a favourite of series writer Joshua Brand.

In October 2025, the film was screened as 'Tribute to David Puttnam' at the 20th Rome Film Festival.

== Stage musical adaptation ==
A stage musical based on the film premiered at the Royal Lyceum Theatre, Edinburgh in 2019. The musical featured music and lyrics by Knopfler (writer of the film soundtrack) and a book by Bill Forsyth (original film screenwriter and director) and David Greig, and was directed by John Crowley.

== See also ==
- BFI Top 100 British films
- List of films with a 100% rating on Rotten Tomatoes
- Cinema of Scotland
