= The Frog Prince (1985 film) =

- Directed by: Brian Gilbert
- Written by: Brian Gilbert
- Produced by: Iain Smith; David Puttnam (Executive)
- Starring: Jane Snowden; Jacqueline Doyen; Françoise Brion
- Cinematography: Clive Tickner
- Edited by: Jim Clark
- Music by: Enya
- Distributed by: Warner Bros. Pictures
- Release dates: 10 May 1985 (Cannes Film Festival); 21 February 1986 (U.S.)
- Countries: United Kingdom; France
- Language: English language
- Budget: £896,000

The Frog Prince (also released as French Lesson) is a 1985 romantic comedy film written and directed by Brian Gilbert. The film was a British and French co-production and was released in the US under the title French Lesson. The story revolves around a young British girl who travels to Paris to go to college and is determined to find the man of her dreams. It stars Jane Snowden as Jenny.

== Plot ==
The film tells the story of Jenny, a British teenager, who has left home for the first time and is going to college in Paris in the early 1960s. Soon, she is smitten by a local Parisian. Although he is a romantic guy, Jenny wants him to prove his love by reciting a few lines to her from Romeo and Juliet, something he finds a tad idiotic. Jenny is crushed when he outright refuses, but later prevails. From then on, she runs into situation after situation in dealing with her crazy friends, a few other young men who find her attractive and, lastly, her French host family headed over by a strict Madame Paroche who is none too pleased to see Jenny having any sort of social life whatsoever.

== Cast ==
- Jane Snowden as Jenny
- Alexandre Sterling as Jean Philippe
- Diana Blackburn as Ros
- Øystein Wiik as Niels
- Jacqueline Doyen as Madame Peroche

== Soundtrack ==
The soundtrack includes nine original instrumental compositions by Enya, four jazz standards performed by Jazz Club, and one song performed by Édith Piaf. Two songs composed and performed by Enya are included on the soundtrack but not featured in the film. These were among the first solo recordings by her to receive wide commercial release, several years before her breakthrough hit, "Orinoco Flow".
