= Arthur's Hallowed Ground =

1983 British TV film

Arthur's Hallowed Ground is a 1983 British TV film directed by Freddie Young.

== Cast ==
- Jimmy Jewel
- Vas Blackwood
- Jean Boht
- David Swift
- Bernard Gallagher
- Michael Elphick
- Derek Benfield
- John Flanagan
- Sam Kelly
- Al Ashton
- Mark Drewry
- Paul McClean
- Ron Forfar

== Production ==
Goldcrest Films invested £319,000 in the film and earned £265,000, causing a loss of £54,000.
