= Forever Young (1983 film) =

- Written by: Ray Connolly
- Directed by: David Drury
- Starring: James Aubrey; Nicholas Gecks
- Country of origin: United Kingdom
- Original language: English

Production
- Producer: Chris Griffin
- Cinematography: Norman Langley
- Editor: Max Lemon
- Running time: 84 min.
- Production company: Goldcrest Films International
- Budget: £506,000

Original release
- Network: Channel 4
- Release: 1983

Forever Young is a 1983 film (US release 1986) written by Ray Connolly and directed by David Drury for Channel 4 as part of their First Love series.

== Plot ==
Jimmy (James Aubrey) and Michael (Nicholas Gecks) were best friends at school in the 1960s. They played guitar and sang together and dreamed of becoming the next Lennon and McCartney or Simon and Garfunkel. Their partnership ended when Michael decided to become a priest. Jimmy eventually became a university lecturer of English literature. The two meet again twenty years later when Jimmy sees posters advertising one of Michael's regular fundraising concerts in his church hall. At first, the two are delighted to see each other, but they gradually remember the events that drove them apart.

The events are shown in flashback. At one of their concerts, Jimmy (played in flashback by Julian Firth) catches sight of Maureen (Oona Kirsch) and tells Michael (Jason Carter) that he has fallen in love. During a strip game involving a music quiz, Maureen becomes topless, which attracts Michael's attention and eventually the two of them make love after one of Jimmy and Michael's concerts.

The events of the past are mirrored in the present day. Father Michael is good friends with Mary (Karen Archer, previously in Giro City) and her son Paul (Liam Holt), who idolises him and wants to become a priest himself. However, Jimmy and Mary get together. The IMDB entry for Forever Young describes this as an act of revenge by Jimmy. Paul discovers them making love and runs away to the church. Michael insists that Paul return home. Thus Michael loses the friendship of Jimmy, Mary and Paul and at the end of the film he is shown bereft.

== Cast ==
- James Aubrey ... James
- Nicholas Gecks ... Father Michael
- Karen Archer ... Mary
- Alec McCowen ... Father Vincent
- Rudi Davies ... Suzie (as Ruth Davies)
- Philip McGough ... Ian
- Kathy Burke ... Girl
- James Wynn ... Brother
- Michael Sundin ... Peter
- Nick Berry ... Boy at School
- Carol MacReady ... Brenda

== Music ==
The film is full of music from the 1950s. The lyrics to the theme music to the film, the song Forever Young, were written by Ray Connolly to a tune based on Farewell to Stromness by Peter Maxwell Davies.

== Box office ==
Goldcrest Films invested £420,000 in the film and made £514,000 earning them a profit of £94,000.
