= Goldcrest Films =

British film production company

- Type: Private
- Industry: Film production Film distribution Post-production
- Founded: 1977; 49 years ago
- Founder: Jake Eberts
- Headquarters: London, England, United Kingdom
- Area served: Worldwide
- Key people: Jake Eberts (CEO); James Lee (chairman)
- Products: Chariots of Fire; Gandhi; Local Hero; The Killing Fields; Hope and Glory; All Dogs Go to Heaven
- Owner: Longman (40%)
- Number of employees: 60 (1989)
- Parent: Longman (40%)
- Divisions: Goldcrest Film and Television; Goldcrest Capital Partners; Goldcrest Pictures; Goldcrest Films International; Goldcrest Post Production
- Website: goldcrestfilms.com

Goldcrest Films is an independent British distribution, production, post production, and finance company. Operating from London and New York, Goldcrest is a privately owned integrated filmed entertainment company.

Goldcrest Films oversees the production, distribution and marketing of films produced by Goldcrest and third-party acquisition in addition to monetising Goldcrest's library of over 100 titles. Goldcrest Films recent slate includes Slumber, Come and Find Me, Stonewall (directed by Roland Emmerich), BBC's EARTH: One Amazing Day (directed by Peter Webber), and Joe Dante's Labirintus.

== History ==
Goldcrest was founded as Goldcrest Films International by Jake Eberts in January 1977 as a feature film enterprise. As of 1981, the UK National Coal Board Pension Fund was a major stakeholder in this company.

The company enjoyed commercial success in the 1980s and the 1990s with films such as Chariots of Fire (1981), Gandhi (1982), Local Hero (1983), The Killing Fields (1984), Hope and Glory (1987), All Dogs Go To Heaven (1989), A Room With a View (1985), the television series Robin of Sherwood (1984–86) and the live-action/animated musical comedy film Rock-a-Doodle (1991). The company also benefited from the new investment of Channel 4 in film production. The company won two Academy Awards for Best Picture, for Chariots of Fire in 1981, and Gandhi in 1982.

After these initial successes the company backed more expensive productions with established Hollywood stars that often ran over schedule and budget culminating in Revolution (1985), The Mission (1986) and Absolute Beginners (1986) that all underperformed at the box office, despite The Mission winning the Palme d'Or at the Cannes Film Festival.

On June 11, 1985, Goldcrest Films had set up a deal with Japanese financer Nippon Herald to finance pictures for up to $2 million. The company ran into financial difficulties, and eventually seeking bids from UK firms in 1987, which included George Walker, and Hemdale, who had a successful film reputation, were offering bids from the studio, but they turned down each time. After attempted takers, Masterman, which was jointly owned by Brent Walker and Ensign Trust would be shown as a possible buyer for the Goldcrest holdings, of which they outbid various offers from other companies, which included a joint bid of Granada Television, the ITV franchisee, and home video and feature film distributor Virgin Vision, which has been touted among other firms.

== Subsidiaries ==
Pearson Longman established Goldcrest Films and Television in 1981, led by the founder of Goldcrest Films, John Eberts, and chaired by James Lee, chief executive of Pearson Longman. At inception, the new concern owned 40% of Goldcrest Films.

Goldcrest Post Production opened in Soho, London in 1982 and in West Village, New York in 2000. Recent expansion and investment has culminated in the opening of central London's largest purpose built Dolby ATMOS Premier sound mixing theatre at Goldcrest's Dean Street, Soho premises. Offering full picture and sound post production services to both the Film and Television industry, Goldcrest Post Production credits include Jason Bourne, Carol, American Honey, Morgan, The Danish Girl.

== Financing arm ==
Goldcrest Films' financing arms, Goldcrest Pictures and Goldcrest Capital Partners, structure transactions in the media sector. From 2006 to 2008 — the first two years of operation — the companies provided services on 18 films, including Twilight, Tropic Thunder, Knowing, Eagle Eye, Revolutionary Road and Angus, Thongs and Perfect Snogging. Goldcrest Capital also raises funds and provides services on UK independent feature films. The first two films of this new initiative were Andrea Arnold's Wuthering Heights - produced by Douglas Rae and Robert Bernstein of Ecosse Films and Kevin Loader and co-financed with the UK Film Council, Film4 and Screen Yorkshire - and Phyllida Lloyd’s biopic of Margaret Thatcher, The Iron Lady. This starred Meryl Streep and was produced by Damian Jones for Pathé, Film4 and the UK Film Council with the participation of Canal+ and Cine Cinema.

== Filmography ==
=== Cinema ===
Film	Year	Budget	Worldwide gross
Chariots of Fire	1981	$5.5 million	$59 million
Escape from New York	1981	$6 million	$50 million
Gandhi	1982	$22 million	$52.8 million (US only)
An Unsuitable Job for a Woman	1982	N/A	N/A
The Plague Dogs	1983	N/A	N/A
Secrets	1983	N/A	N/A
Local Hero	1983	N/A	$5.9 million
The Ploughman's Lunch	1983	N/A	N/A
Runners	1983	N/A	N/A
The Dresser	1983	N/A	$5.3 million
Another Country	1984	N/A	N/A
Cal	1984	N/A	N/A
The Killing Fields	1984	$14.4 million	$34.7 million
Nemo	1984	N/A	N/A
Dance with a Stranger	1985	N/A	$2.3 million
Smooth Talk	1985	N/A	$16,785
Revolution	1985	$28 million	$346,761
Mr. Love	1985	£486,000	$4,264
The Frog Prince	1986	$1.5 million	N/A
Winter Flight	1986	N/A	$2,729
Absolute Beginners	1986	£8.4 million	$1 million
The Mission	1986	$24.5 million	$17.2 million
Knights & Emeralds	1986	£1.1 million	N/A
White Mischief	1987	$5.3 million	$3.1 million
Matewan	1987	$4 million	$1.7 million
Hope and Glory	1987	$3 million	$10 million
Black Rainbow	1989	$7 million	N/A
All Dogs Go to Heaven	1989	$13.8 million	$27.1 million
Rock-a-Doodle	1991	$18 million	$11.7 million
Space Truckers	1996	$25 million	$1,614,266
Driftwood	1997	N/A	N/A
Clockwatchers	1997	N/A	$537,948
Bring Me the Head of Mavis Davis	1997	N/A	£46,244
Elvis and Anabelle	2007	N/A	N/A
Cass	2008	N/A	N/A
The Iron Lady	2011	$13 million	$114.9 million
Earth: One Amazing Day	2017		

=== Television ===
Title	Year	Series
P'tang, Yang, Kipperbang	1982	First Love
Forever Young	1983	First Love
Those Glory Glory Days	1983	First Love
Arthur's Hallowed Ground	1983	
Tottie: The Story of a Doll's House	1984	
Concealed Enemies	1984	
Sharma and Beyond	1984	First Love
Robin of Sherwood	1984–86	
