= Sharma and Beyond =

1984 British TV movie

Sharma and Beyond is a 1984 British TV movie, directed by Brian Gilbert and starring Michael Maloney, Robert Urquhart, Tom Wilkinson and Suzanne Burden.

Goldcrest Films invested £504,000 in the film and received £340,000, resulting in a loss of £164,000.
