= Maria egiziaca =

Opera by Ottorino Respighi

- Opera by Ottorino Respighi
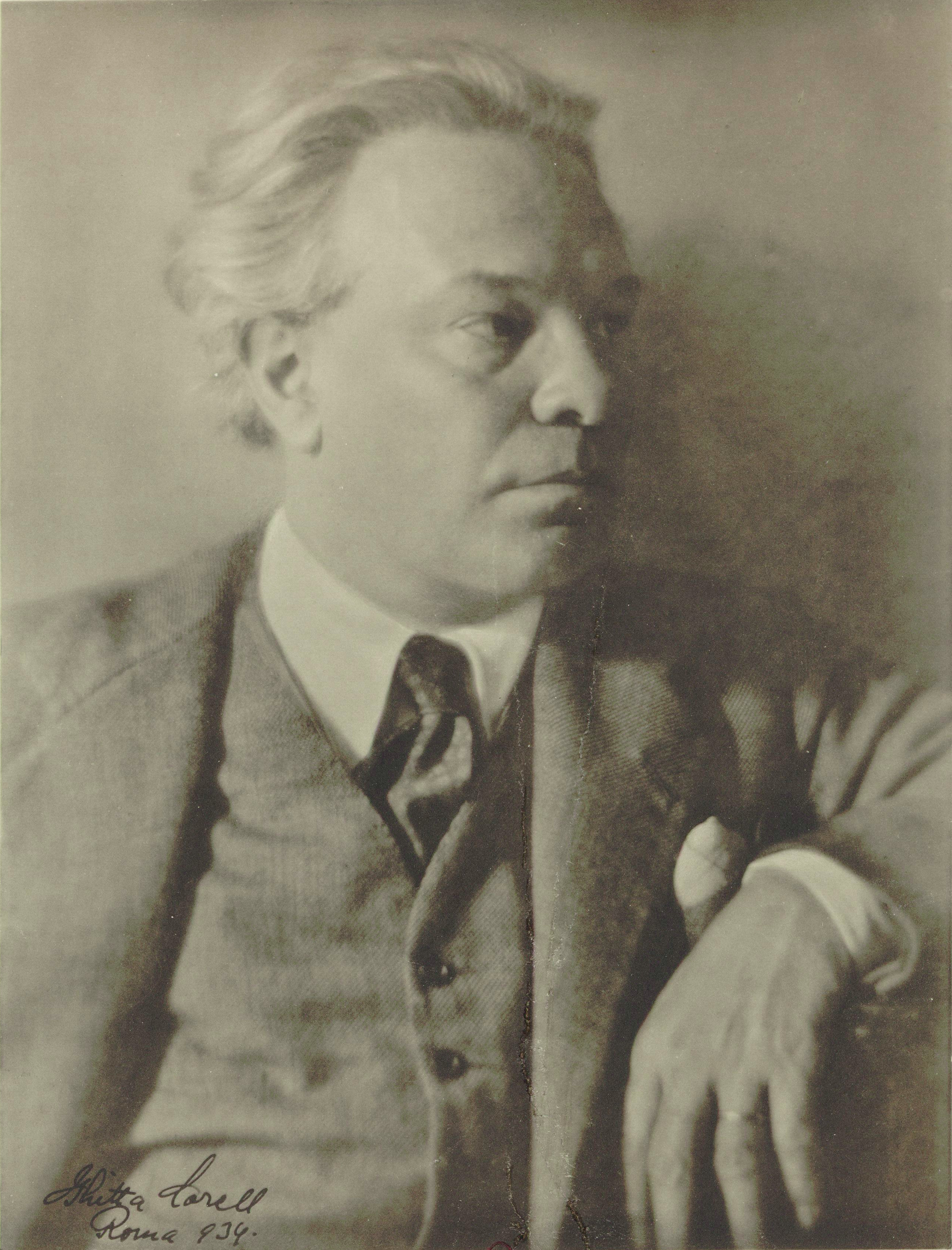
- Respighi in 1934
- Librettist: Claudio Guastalla
- Language: Italian
- Based on: Life of Saint Mary of Egypt
- Premiere: 10 August 1932; Teatro Goldoni, Venice

Maria egiziaca (Saint Mary of Egypt) is an opera in a single three-episode act by the Italian composer Ottorino Respighi. The libretto, by Claudio Guastalla, is based on a medieval life of Saint Mary of Egypt, contained in the translation into the vernacular of the Vitae Patrum written by Domenico Cavalca.

The work was originally intended as a concert piece although it has been fully staged in some revivals. It was first performed at Carnegie Hall, New York City, on 16 March 1932. The first stage performance was at the Teatro Goldoni in Venice on 10 August 1932. Both the language of the libretto and the music employ archaism; Respighi's score contains stylistic echoes of Gregorian chant, Renaissance music and Monteverdi.

== Roles ==
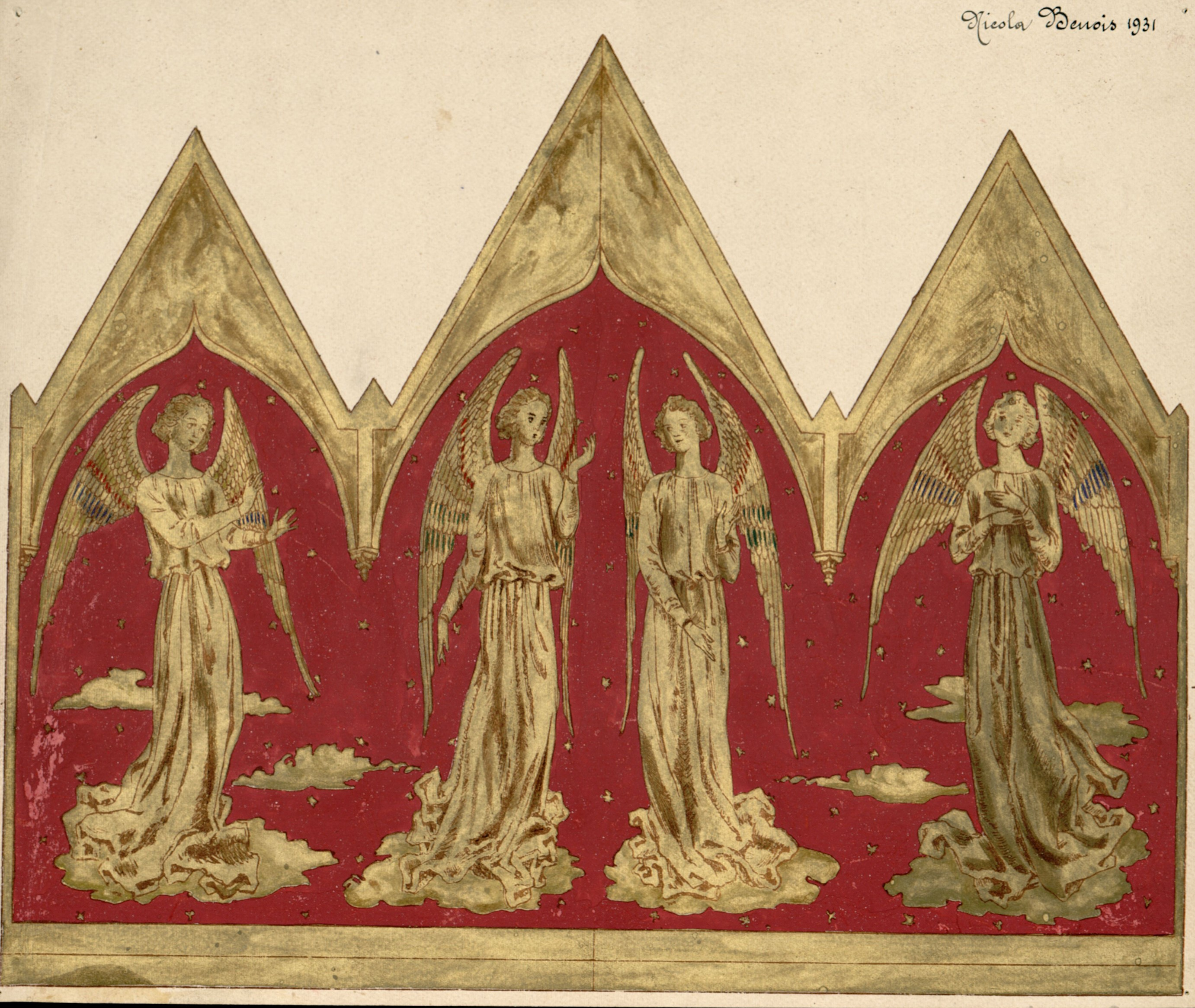
Trittico con angeli, set design for Maria Egiziaca (1931).

Roles, voice types, premiere cast
Role	Voice type	Premiere cast, 16 March 1932 Conductor: Ottorino Respighi
Maria	soprano	Charlotte Börner
Abbate Zosimo (Abbot Zosima)/Pilgrim	baritone	Nelson Eddy
Sailor	tenor	Alfredo Tedeschi
The leper	tenor	
Second companion/Poor man	contralto	Myrtle Leonard
First companion/Blind woman/Voice of an angel	soprano	Helen Gleason

== Instrumentation ==
Maria egiziaca is scored for the following instruments:

flute, oboe, 2 clarinets, bassoon, 2 horns, trumpet, 2 trombones, harpsichord (or piano), strings.

== Synopsis ==
The prostitute Mary suddenly feels an overwhelming longing to travel to Jerusalem. Here she repents her sins and an angel tells her to go to the desert where she lives in prayer until old age. She is found dying by Saint Zosimas, who digs her grave with the help of a lion.

== Recordings ==
Year	Cast: Maria, Sailor, Pilgrim	Conductor, opera house and orchestra	Label
1980	Javora Stoilova, Nazzareno Antinori, Carlo Desideri	Ottavio Ziino, Orchestra and Chorus of Conservatorio di Santa Cecilia (Live recording at Respighi Festival, Assisi)	CD: Bongiovanni; Cat: GL 2008-2 (published 1999)
1989	Veronika Kincses, Janos Nagy, Lajos Miller	Lamberto Gardelli, Choir of the Hungarian Radio and Television and Hungarian State Orchestra	CD: Hungaroton; Cat: HCD 31118
