= Saint Mary of Egypt (Ribera) =

1641 painting by José de Ribera

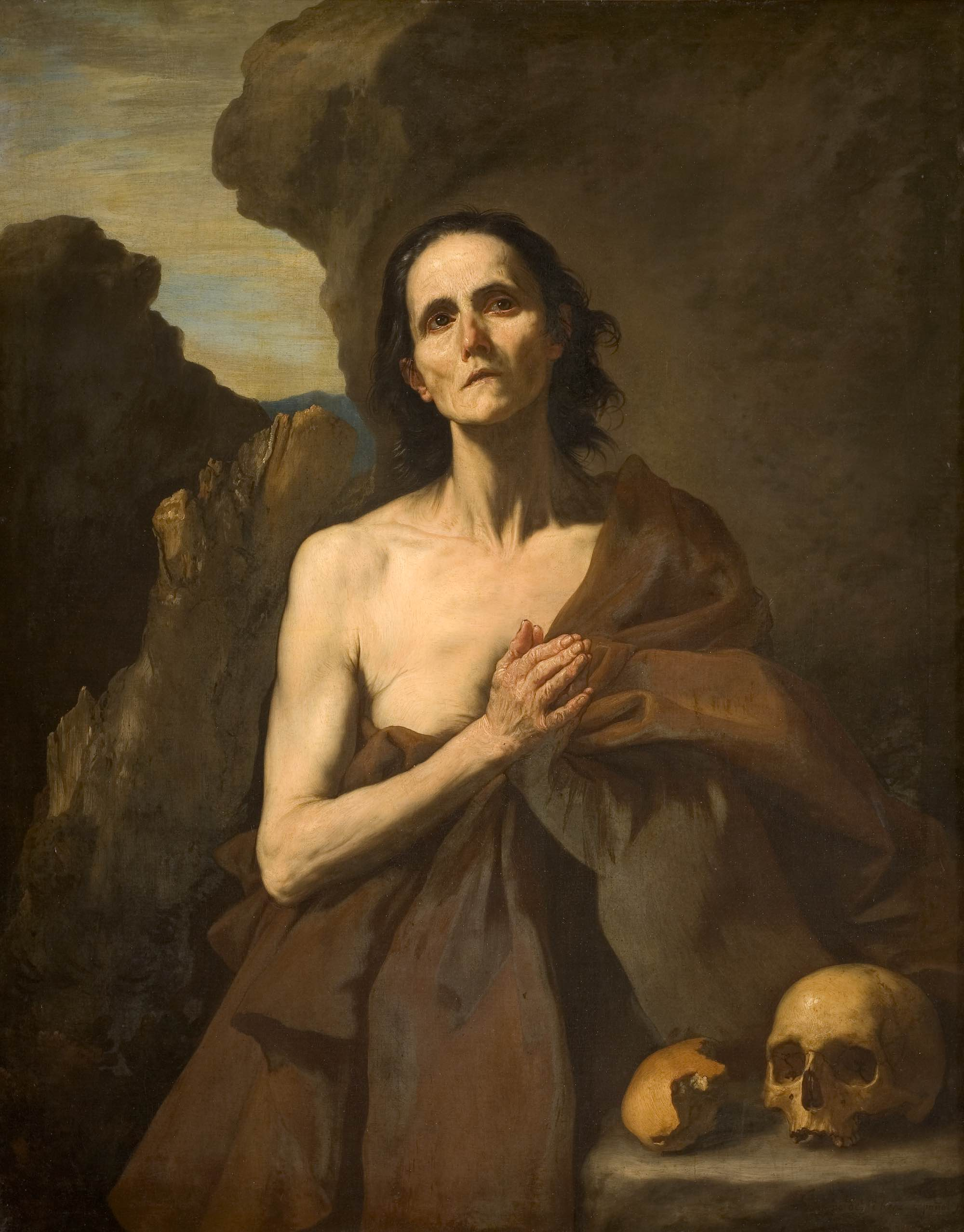
Saint Mary of Egypt (1641) by Jusepe de Ribera

Saint Mary of Egypt is an oil on canvas painting of the 4th century ascetic saint Mary of Egypt by José de Ribera, executed in 1641. It is now in the Musée Fabre in Montpellier, which acquired it in 1837.
