= Adriaan Reins Altarpiece =

Altarpiece by Hans Memling in Bruges, Belgium

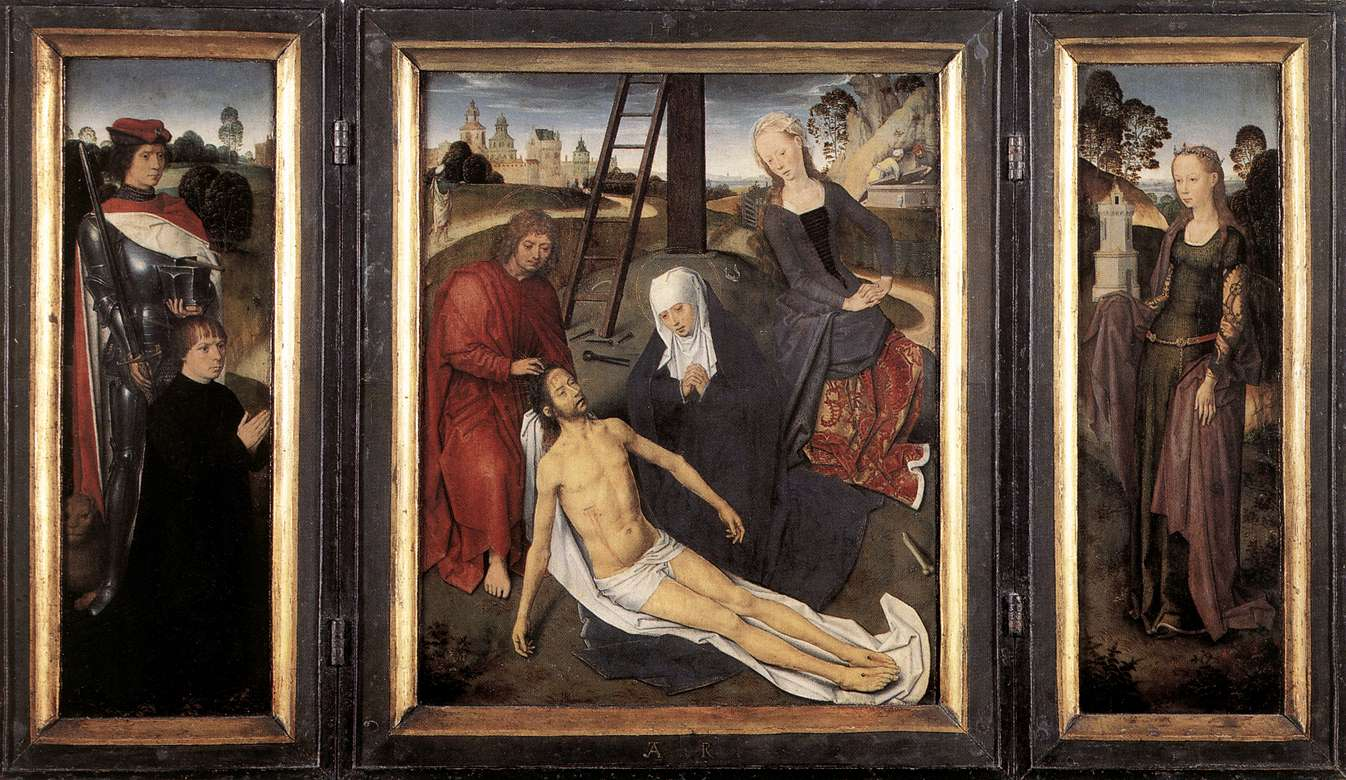
The altarpiece open

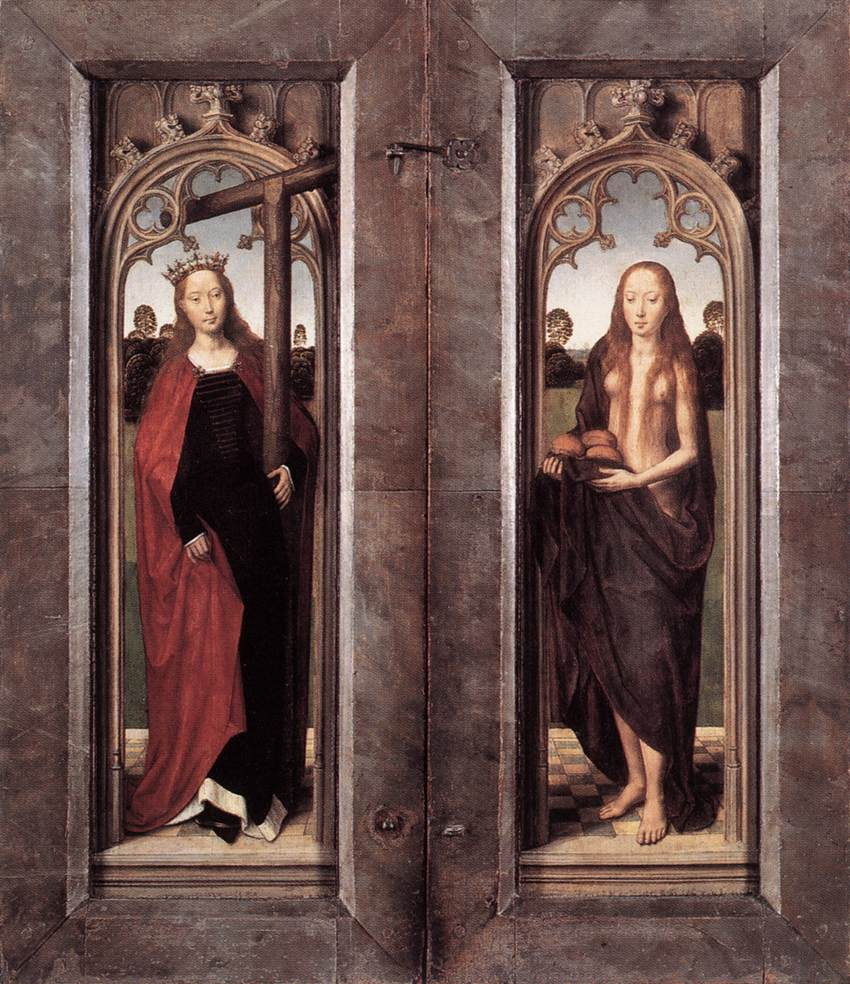
The altarpiece closed, showing outer panels of Wilgefortis (left) and Mary of Egypt (right).

The Adriaan Reins Altarpiece is a three-panel 1480 altarpiece, painted by Hans Memling for brother Adriaan Reins of the Old St. John's Hospital in Bruges. It still hangs there as part of the collection of the Memlingmuseum.

== Sources ==
- Ilse E. Friesen, The Female Crucifix: Images of St. Wilgefortis Since the Middle Ages, Wilfrid Laurier Univ. Press, 2006 p. 55
- (in Dutch) Irene Smets, Ludiongids Het Memlingmuseum-Sint-Janshospitaal Brugge, Ludion Gent-Amsterdam, 2001 pp. 64–68
