= Mary of Egypt =

Egyptian grazer saint of Late antiquity

Saint Mary of Egypt
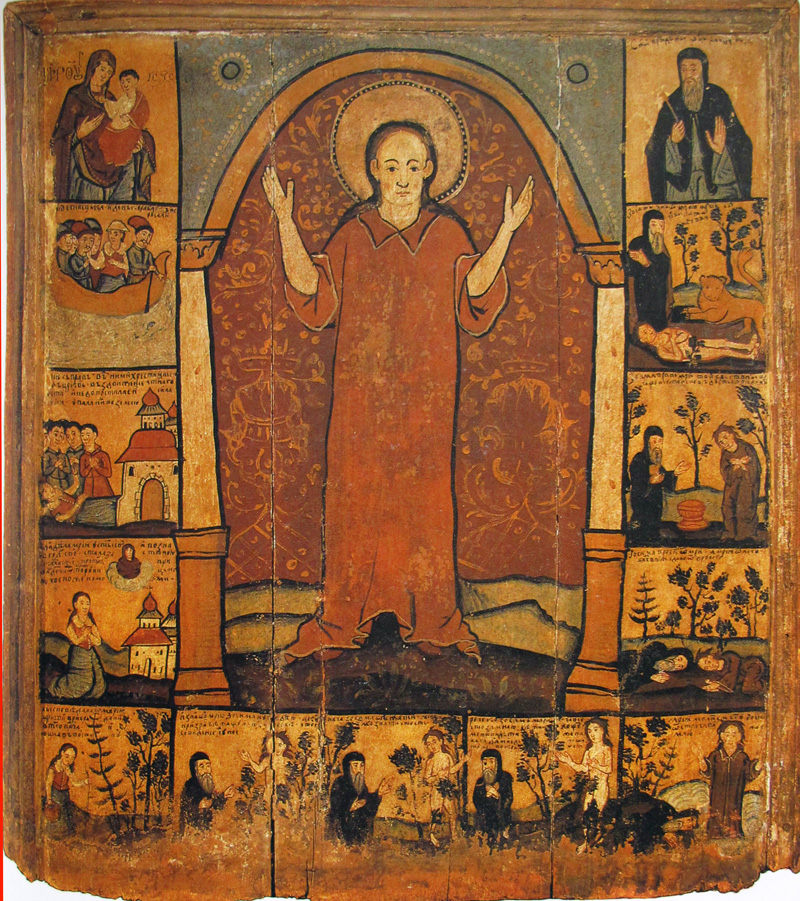
- Mary of Egypt with her Life. Ukrainian icon, late 17th century. Liskowate village. Collection of the Andrey Sheptytsky National Museum of Lviv.
- Born: Province of Egypt, Eastern Roman Empire
- Died: Trans-Jordan desert, Palaestina, Eastern Roman Empire
- Venerated in: Eastern Orthodox Church; Oriental Orthodoxy; Roman Catholic Church; Eastern Catholic churches; Anglican Communion
- Canonized: Pre-congregation
- Feast: Eastern Orthodox and Greek Catholic: 1 April; 5th Sunday of Great Lent; Coptic Orthodox: Parmouti 6; Roman Catholic: 1 April (Ordinary Form)/ 2 April (Extraordinary Form)
- Attributes: Cilice, skull, loaves of bread
- Patronage: Chastity (warfare against the flesh; deliverance from carnal passions); demons (deliverance from); fever; skin diseases; temptations of the flesh

Mary of Egypt (Greek: Μαρία ἡ Αἰγυπτία; Coptic: Ϯⲁⲅⲓⲁ Ⲙⲁⲣⲓⲁ Ⲛⲣⲉⲙⲛ̀ⲭⲏⲙⲓ; Egyptian Arabic: مريم المصرية/ماريا المصرية; Amharic/Geez: ቅድስት ማርያም ግብፃዊት; Latin: Maria Aegyptiaca) was an Egyptian grazer saint said to have dwelled in Byzantine-era Palestine in the 5th century AD (in late antiquity / Early Middle Ages).

The hagiography The Life of Our Venerable Mother Mary of Egypt tells her life story through the framing device of an encounter with the hieromonk Zosimas of Palestine near the Jordan River, describing a debauched life of lust in which she traveled from Alexandria to Jerusalem and seduced pilgrims on their way to the Elevation of the Holy Cross. At the Church of the Holy Sepulchre she encountered the icon of the Theotokos, barring her entrance and instructing her to cross the Jordan River and wander the desert as an ascetic. Mary and Zosimas part ways, resolving to meet by the Jordan one year later so that Zosimas can administer Holy Communion; at this meeting Zosimas witnesses Mary walking on the water.

The story concludes with Zosimas waiting one year hence to reunite only to find Mary's deceased body; after praying he receives divine instruction to provide her Christian burial. The hagiography then states that Zosimas told his fellow monks about Mary, and that these monks related the story to the text's credited author Sophronius, Patriarch of Jerusalem, in the 7th century.

Later, in the 8th century the hagiography was read into the record at the Fourth Session of the historical Second Council of Nicaea, preserving it. The Council, debating whether to revive the practice of icon veneration amid Byzantine iconoclasm, heard Mary of Egypt's conversion as an argument for the virtues of icons.

The Roman Martyrology of the Catholic Church, Synaxarion of Constantinople of Eastern Orthodox Church, and the Copto-Arabic Synaxarion of the Coptic Orthodox Church each list Mary of Egypt as a saint with a feast day. The Martyrology characterizes her time in the desert as an act of penitence and mortification. In contrast, the Synaxarion of Constantinople emphasizes her time in the desert as spiritual elevation through self-control.

The historicity of Mary of Egypt is uncertain and has been questioned by some historians. Historians further note that artists of Medieval and Renaissance Europe regularly conflated Mary of Egypt with Mary Magdalene.

== Life ==
According to tradition, Mary of Egypt was born somewhere in the Roman Province of Egypt, and at the age of twelve ran away from her parents to the city of Alexandria. There, she lived an extremely dissolute life. In her Vita it states that she often refused the money offered for her sexual favors, as she was driven "by an insatiable and an irrepressible passion", and that she mainly lived by begging, supplemented by spinning flax.

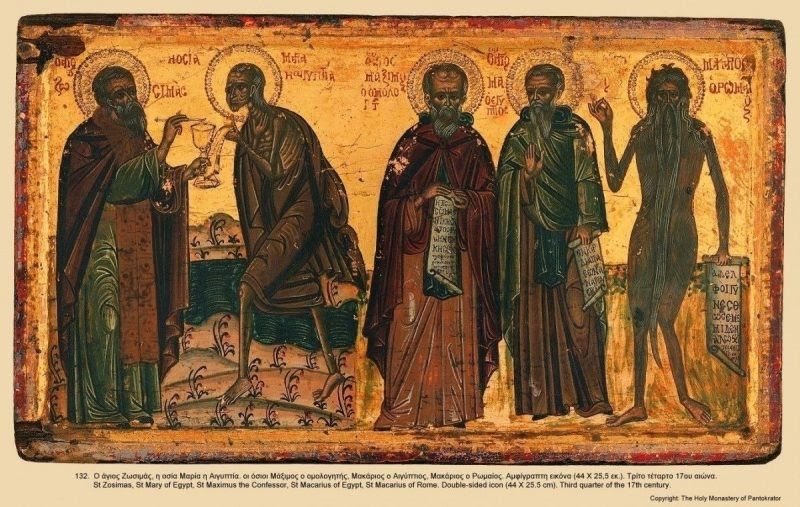
Saints Zosimas, Mary of Egypt, Maximus the Confessor, Macarius of Egypt, and Macarius of Alexandria. Icon, 17th century. Pantocrator. Mount Athos.

After seventeen years of this lifestyle, she traveled to Jerusalem for the Great Feasts of the Exaltation of the Holy Cross. She undertook the journey as a sort of "anti-pilgrimage", stating that she hoped to find in the pilgrim crowds at Jerusalem even more partners to sate her lust. She paid for her passage by offering sexual favors to other pilgrims, and she briefly continued her habitual lifestyle in Jerusalem. Her Vita relates that when she tried to enter the Church of the Holy Sepulchre for the celebrations, she was barred by an unseen force. Realizing this was because of her impurity, she was struck with remorse, and upon seeing an icon of the Theotokos (the Virgin Mary) outside the church, she prayed for forgiveness and promised to give up the world (i.e., become an ascetic). She attempted again to enter the church, and this time was able to go in. After venerating the relic of the True Cross, she returned to the icon to give thanks, and heard a voice telling her, "If you cross the Jordan, you will find glorious rest." She immediately went to the monastery of Saint John the Baptist on the banks of the River Jordan, where she received absolution and afterwards Holy Communion. The next morning, she crossed the Jordan eastwards and retired to the desert to live the rest of her life as a hermit in penitence. She took with her only three loaves of bread she had bought, and once she had eaten these, lived only on what she could find in the wilderness.

Approximately one year before her death, she recounted her life to Zosimas of Palestine, who encountered her in the desert. When he unexpectedly met her in the desert, she was completely naked and almost unrecognizable as human. She asked Zosimas to toss her his mantle to cover herself with, and then she narrated her life's story to him. She asked him to meet her at the banks of the Jordan on Holy Thursday of the following year, and to bring her Holy Communion. When he fulfilled her wish, she crossed the river to get to him by walking on the water, and received Holy Communion, telling him to meet her again in the desert the following Lent.

Tradition says that Zosimas went to the same spot where he first met her, some twenty days' journey from his monastery. There, he found her lying dead; an inscription written in the sand next to her head stated that she had died the very night he had given her Communion, her incorrupt body miraculously transported to that spot. He buried her body with the assistance of a passing lion. On returning to his monastery, he related her life story to the other brethren, and it was preserved among them as oral tradition.

== Veneration ==
=== Hagiography ===
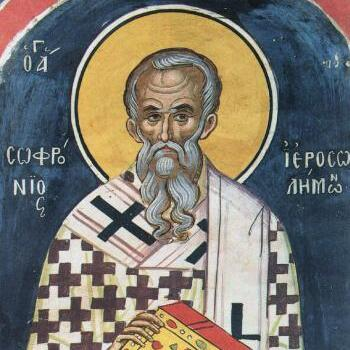
Athonite fresco Icon of 7th century Patriarch Sophronius of Jerusalem, the historical figure credited as writing the hagiography of Mary of Egypt.

The written hagiography "The Life of Our Venerable Mother Mary of Egypt" is stated by several sources to have been written by Sophronius in the 7th century. Later scholarship suggested that the hagiography may have been written earlier "from some other hand."

Documentary evidence shows that in the 8th century the hagiography was read into the record at the Fourth Session of the historical Second Council of Nicaea, preserving it. The Council, debating whether to revive the practice of icon veneration amid Byzantine iconoclasm, heard Mary of Egypt's conversion as an argument for the virtues of icons.

==== In Western Christianity ====
Distinct from Eastern and Coptic Christians, Western Christianity from late antiquity to the Late Middle Ages not only translated Sophronius from the Greek to Latin and vernacular languages, but also created derivative and reinterpreted works in both prose and poetry. This process starts with translation of the text of Sophronius to Latin, credited to 9th century monk Paul the Deacon.

Further evidence of the 9th century arrival of Mary of Egypt's cultus in the West can be found in the inclusion of her name in the marble calendar of Naples (which combined Byzantine and Latin liturgical calendars) as well as the rededication of the Temple of Portunus to Mary of Egypt, each approximately dated to the 870s.

===== Early Middle Ages =====
The Frankish chronicler Flodoard, priest of the Reims Cathedral, included the narrative of Mary of Egypt and Zosimas as part of his 10th century Latin epic poem On the Triumphs of Christ and the Saints of Palestine about the early church. A hagiography in Latin verse is attributed to late 10th/early 11th century theologian Hildebert of Lavardin, with several copies kept by the Bodleian Library.

An Old English version of Mary of Egypt's hagiography is found in the same manuscript that is the primary witness of Ælfric of Eynsham's Lives of Saints. According to Hugh Magennis, the hagiography of Mary was not, however, written by Ælfric himself, as "features of which suggest that it was originally written in the Anglian dialect area rather than in the West Saxon with which Ælfric is associated."

A brief account of Mary of Egypt's encounter with the icon of the Theotokos appears in the 11th century compilations of Marian miracles by the monks William of Malmesbury and Dominic of Evesham. Although brief and in Latin, scholars note that these accounts use a third-person perspective about Mary of Egypt herself, rather than the first-person narrative of Zosimas.

===== High to Late Middle Ages =====
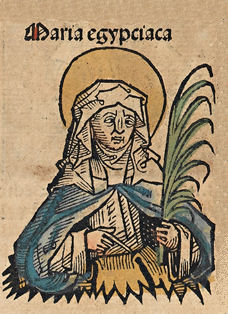
Nuremberg Chronicle image of Mary of Egypt. The palm leaf refers to Mary's pilgrimage.

In the 12th century an anonymously authored poetic version of Life of Saint Mary of Egypt in Anglo-Norman appears in the textual record. According to scholar Duncan Robertson, this poem begins a shift in narratives and descriptions of Mary of Egypt in Western art and literature: it is here she is first described as blond, her sensual beauty and sexual appetite is emphasized (although later disavowed), and her relationship with Zosimas takes on the tone of a platonic love.

The Anglo-Norman poem then inspired adaptations in other European vernacular languages: in 13th century French poet Rutebeuf writes his own Life of Saint Mary of Egypt and further popularizing her cult within France. A similar poem (Vida de Santa María Egipcíaca) in Castilian Spanish (showing Aragonese influence) was composed in the 13th century.

Mary of Egypt's hagiography was included in the 13th century compilation The Golden Legend by Jacobus de Voragine, widely believed to be second only to the Bible among books read in the Middle Ages when it was considered authoritative.

In the 13th to 14th centuries, several Old Norse versions of Mary of Egypt's story were composed. Notably, in these retellings change the setting from a desert to a forest, and change the animal that helps Zosimas to a wolf.

The 15th century Nuremberg Chronicle includes a brief biography of Mary of Egypt within its section on the Sixth Age.

===== Post-Reformation period =====
The Roman Catholic Church in its 16th century Counter-Reformation-period preserved veneration of Mary of Egypt in the Roman Martyrology. Acta Sanctorum, the 17th century Bollandist effort to bring scholarly rigor to hagiography, provides a critical commentary on the accumulated lore about Mary of Egypt. According to the Catholic Encyclopedia, the Bollandists concluded Mary of Egypt likely had an earlier birthdate, and that both her cultus and hagiography had origins earlier than Sophronius.

The Church of England altered but did not abolish its recognition of saints. Mary of Egypt was mentioned in the writings of 17th century Anglican cleric Jeremy Taylor.

=== Iconography ===
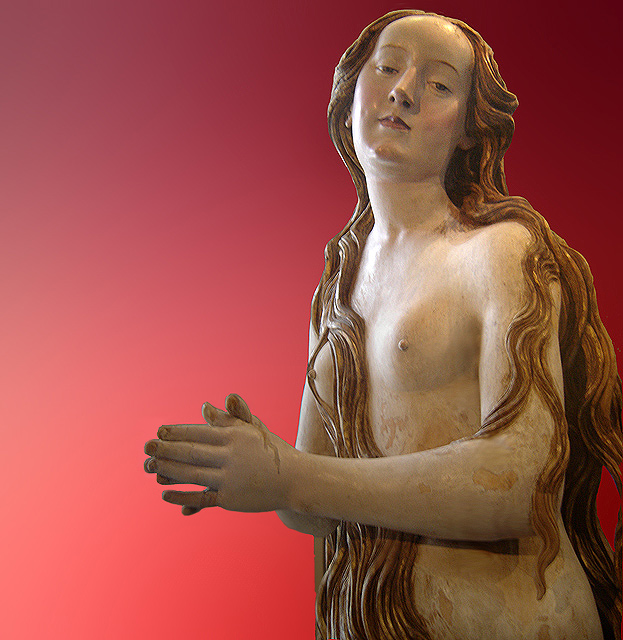
Penitent Mary Magdelene (c. 1515-1520) attributed to Gregor Erhart, uses the iconography of a nude woman clothed in her own hair, a visual cue borrowed from depictions of Mary of Egypt.

In iconography, Mary of Egypt is depicted covered by her long hair or by the mantle she borrowed from Zosimas. She is often shown with the three loaves of bread she bought before her final journey into the desert.

As in hagiographical tradition, the appearance of Mary of Egypt in visual art diverges between the eastern and western Christian traditions: Orthodox, Coptic, and Byzantine Rite Catholic icons preserved the tradition of depicting her as gaunt, elderly and emaciated relatively unchanged. In contrast, the artists of Western Europe often conflated aspects of Mary of Egypt's characterization and story with that of Mary Magdalene (and similar "prostitute saints" such as Pelagia) due to a similar folklore, themes, and appeal.

Consequently, Western artworks have depicted a younger Mary of Egypt than their Eastern counterparts, as well as a "Penitent" Mary Magdalene who is clad only in her own hair.

Examples of such conflations include:

- The frescoes of the Magadalene Chapel in Assisi painted by Giotto depict episodes of the life of Mary Magdalene. Nevertheless, they include an episode that is unambiguously from the life of Mary of Egypt (her meeting with Zosimas in the desert).
- Conversely, paintings by Jusepe de Ribera titled as "Mary of Egypt" include skull iconography associated with Mary Magdalene (originating with folklore about Mary Magdalene's late life in the grotto of Sainte-Baume).

==== Gallery ====
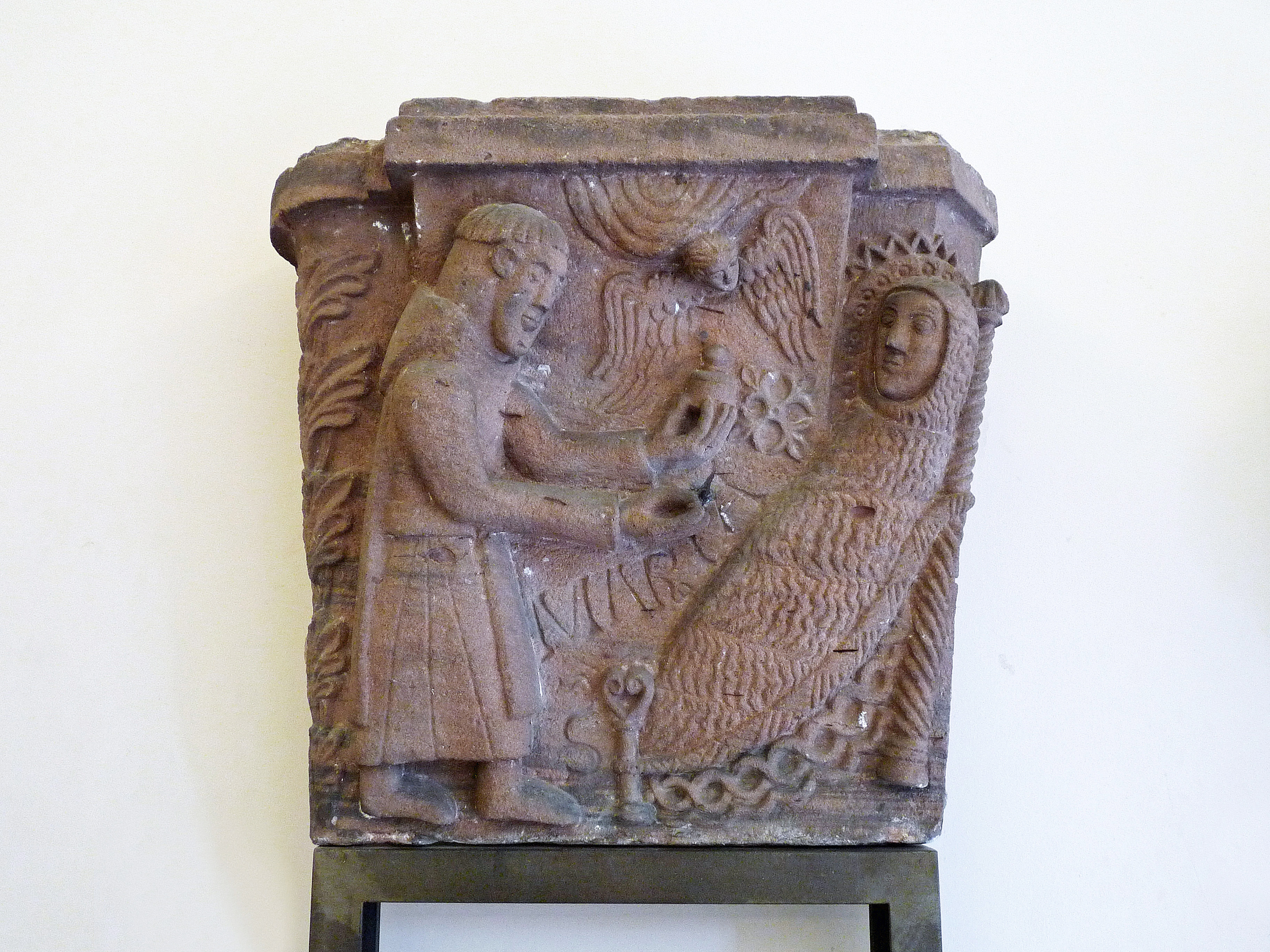
The last communion of Mary of Egypt on the capital of a transverse arch dated to mid-12th century, from the collection of the Unterlinden Museum.

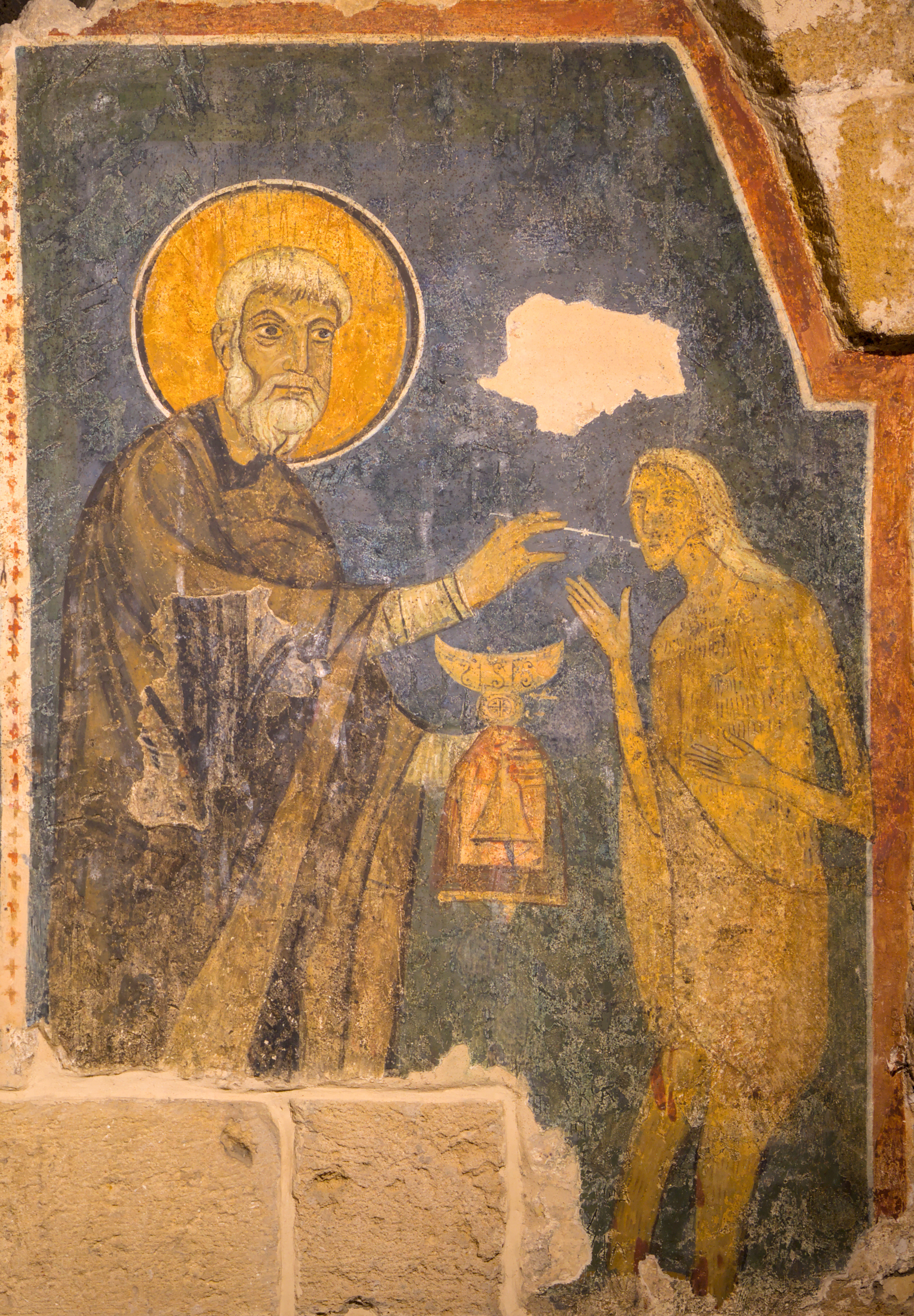
Fresco dated to 12-13th-century in the crypt of Taranto Cathedral, Apulia, Italy.

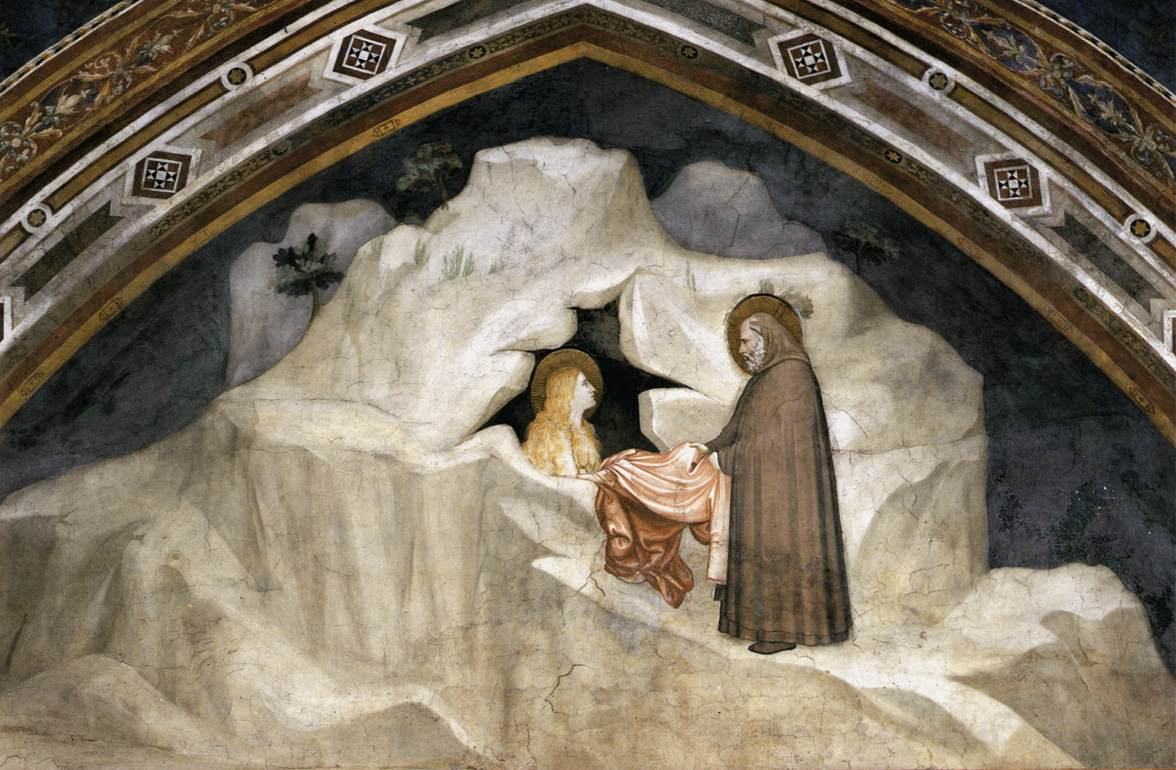
The Hermit Zosimus Giving a Cloak to Magdalene (1320s) by Giotto in the Magdalene Chapel in the Lower Basilica of Saint Francis of Assisi. Although the title and chapel are dedicated to Mary Magdalene, the story of Zosimus giving his cloak is from the hagiography of Mary of Egypt.

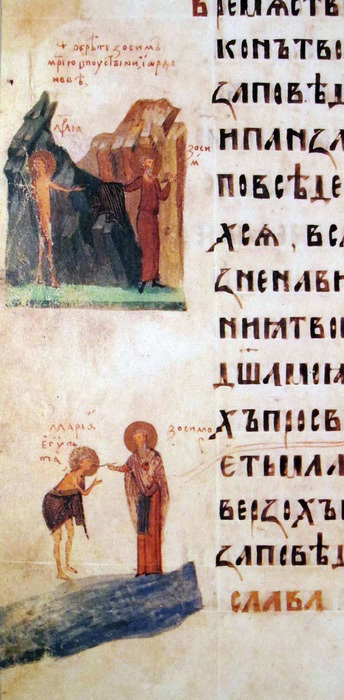
The Life of Mary of Egypt in the Kyiv Psalter, 1397. One of the earliest depictions of Saint Mary of Egypt in the Ukrainian iconographic tradition.

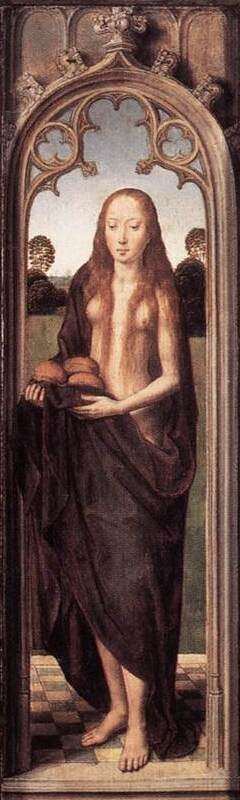
Detail from the Adriaan Reins Altarpiece(1480) by Hans Memling depicting a nude Mary of Egypt with three loaves. From the collection of the Old St. John's Hospital in Bruges

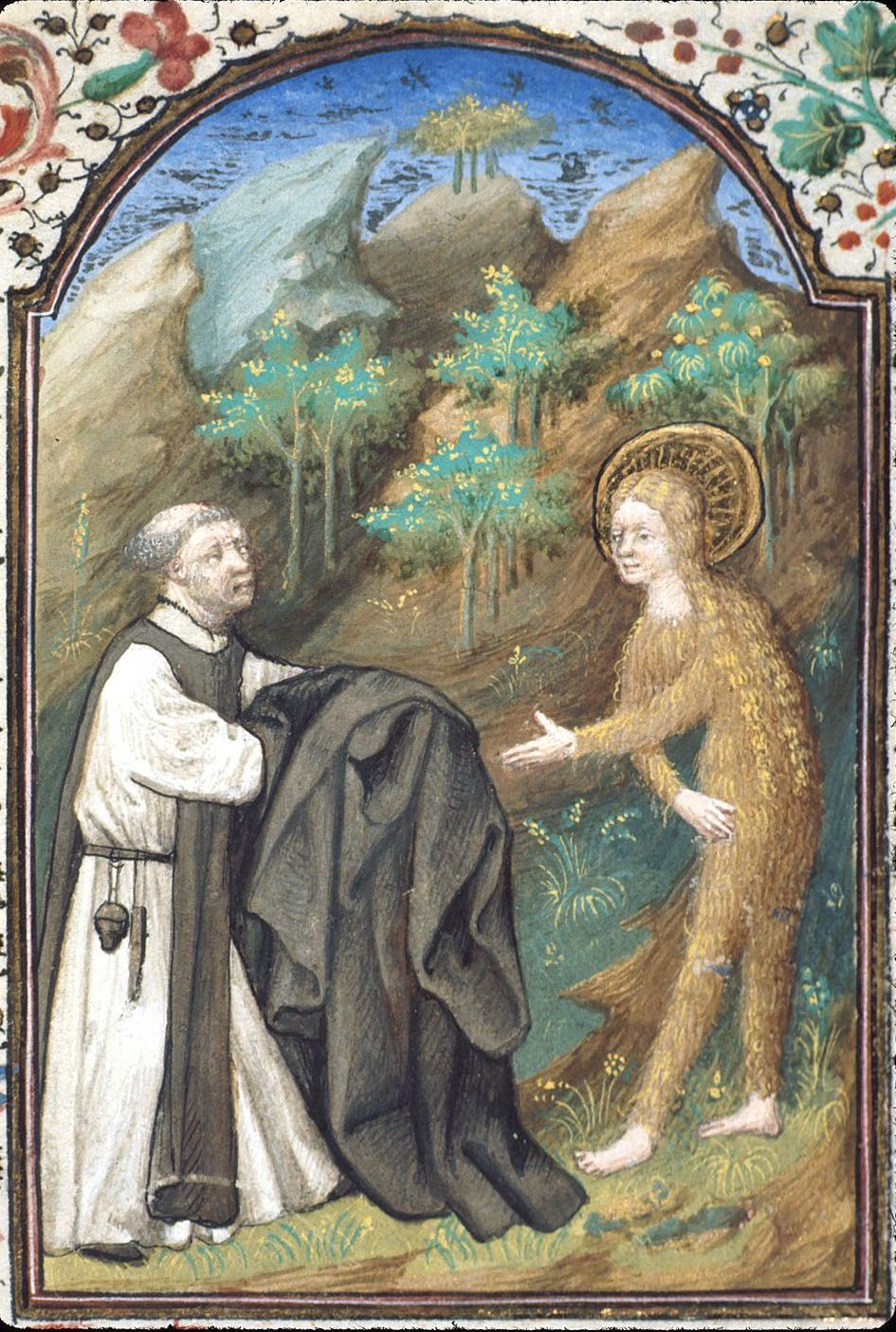
Detail of a miniature of Mary of Egypt, covered in golden hair, receiving a cloak from Zosimas at the beginning of her ascetic life. Origin: Paris, France. Yates Thompson 3, folio 287. 15th century (British Library)

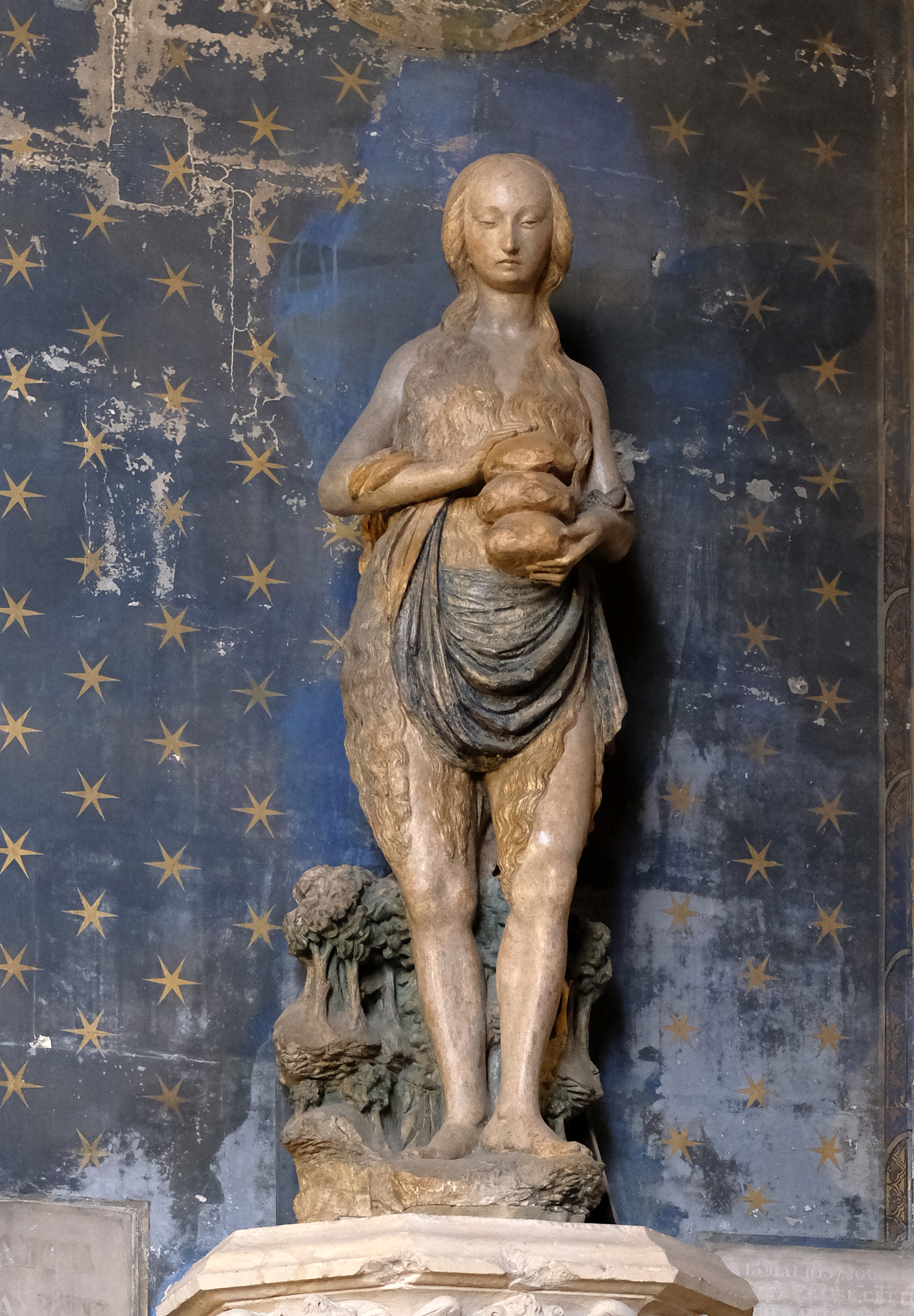
Statue dated to the early 16th Century in Saint-Germain l'Auxerrois, Paris.

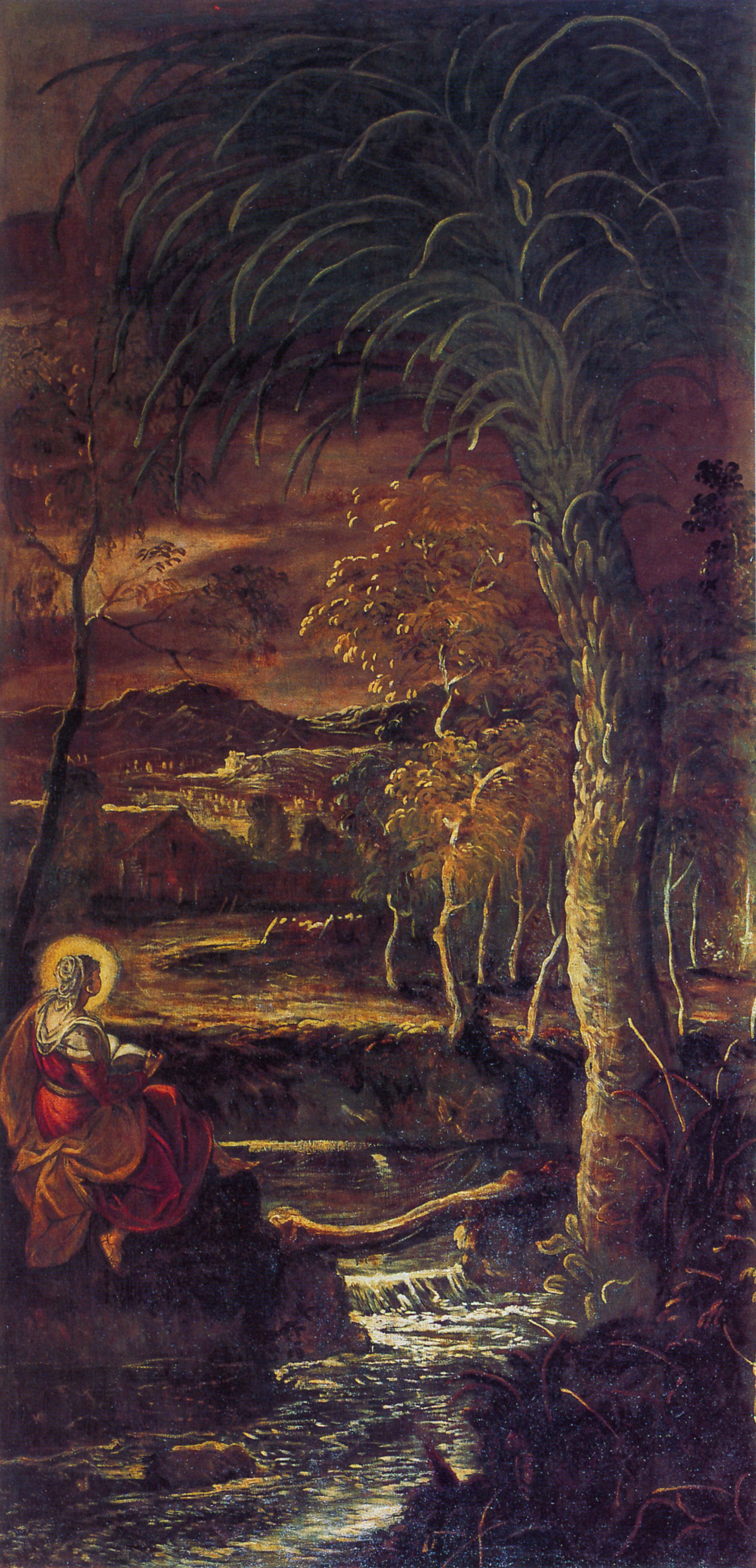
Saint Mary of Egypt (1582 - 1587) by Tintoretto. Half of the diptych, Saint Mary Magdalene and Saint Mary of Egypt

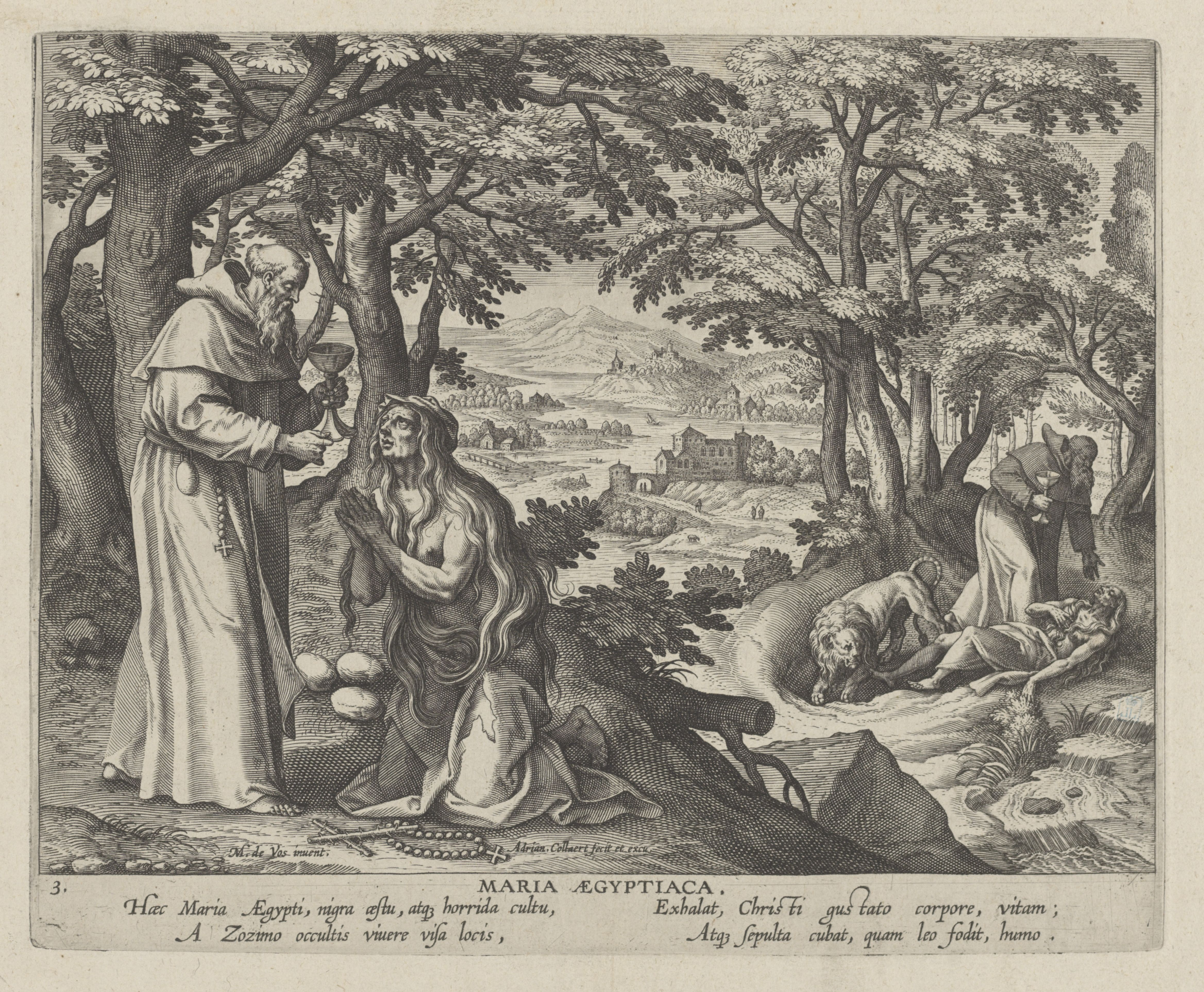
16th Century print by Maerten de Vos, S.I 804, Prints Department, Royal Library of Belgium

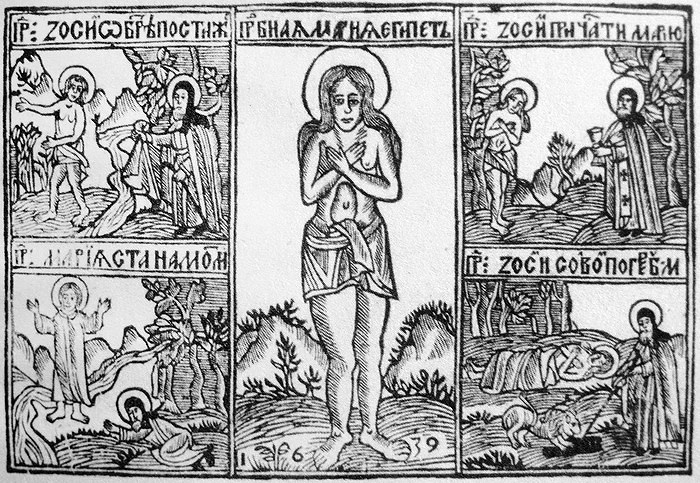
Mary of Egypt with her Life. Ukrainian woodcut, 1639. The hermit is shown full-length, flanked by four scenes from her life: meeting with the hermit Zosimas, Communion, prayer, and burial.

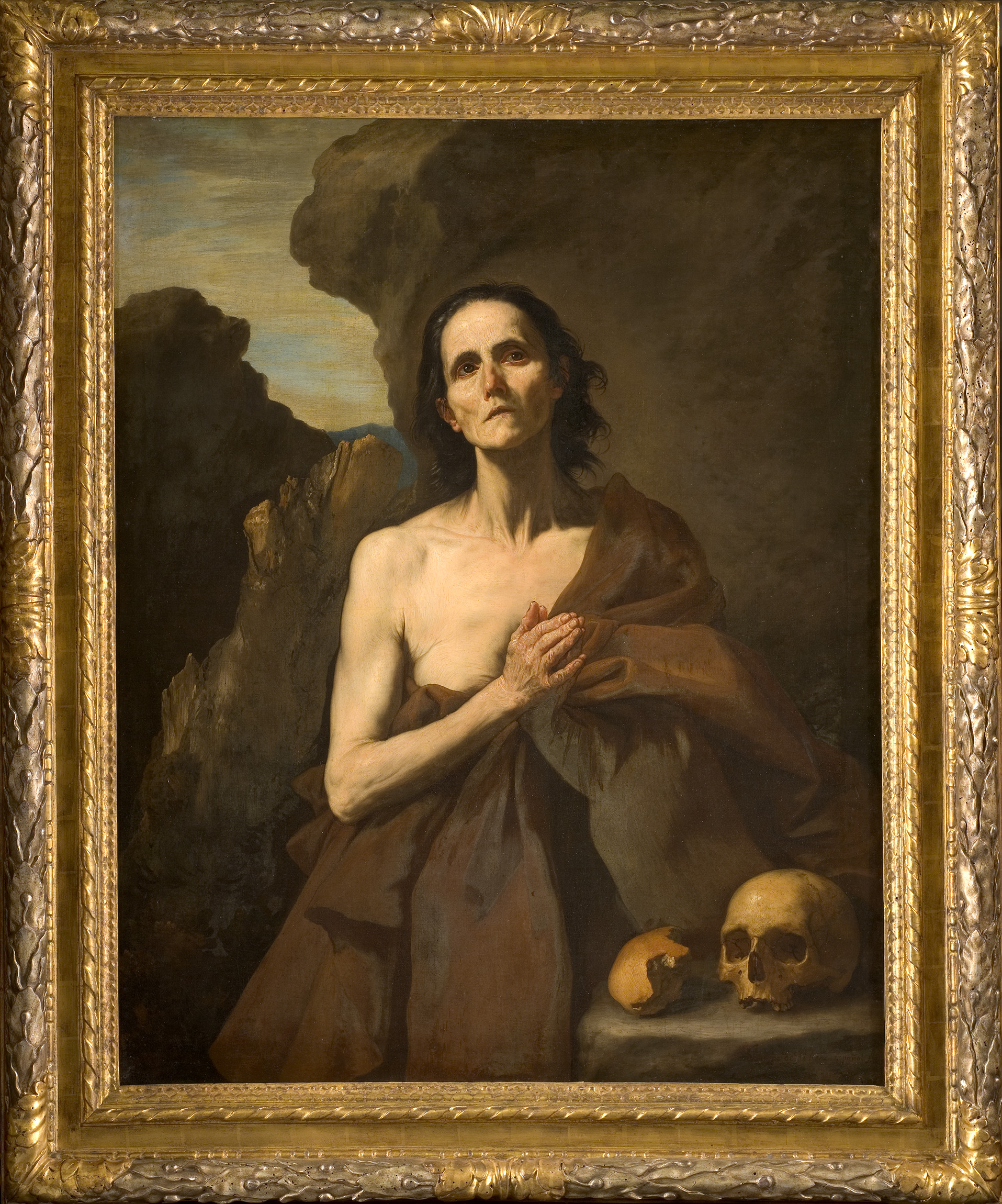
Jusepe de Ribera (1591–1652). Saint Mary of Egypt. 1641.

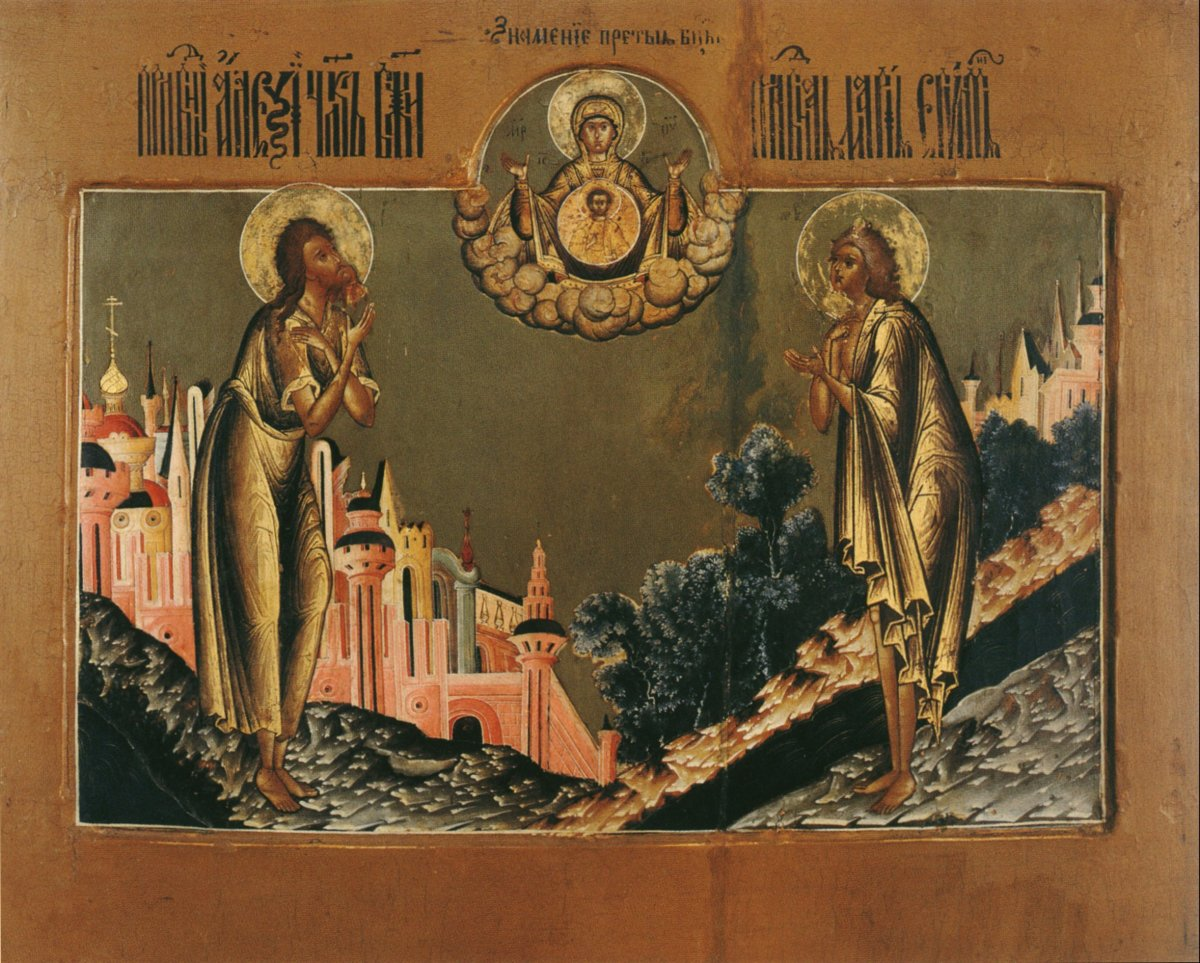
Patronal icon of Alexius of Rome and Mary of Egypt painted for the wedding of Tsar Alexei Mikhailovich and Maria Miloslavskaya in 1648.

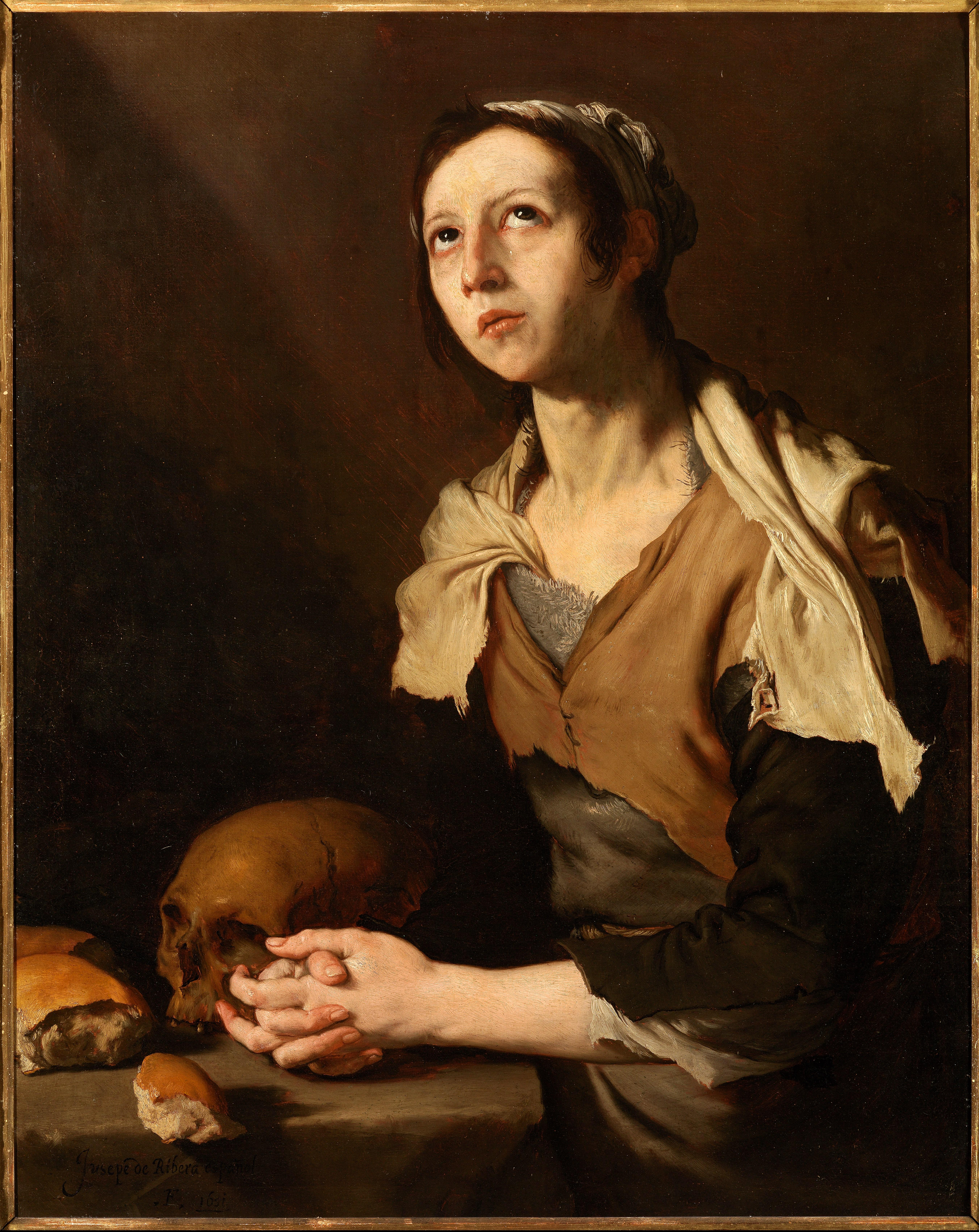
Mary of Egypt (1651) by de Ribera from the collection of the Museo Civico Filangieri

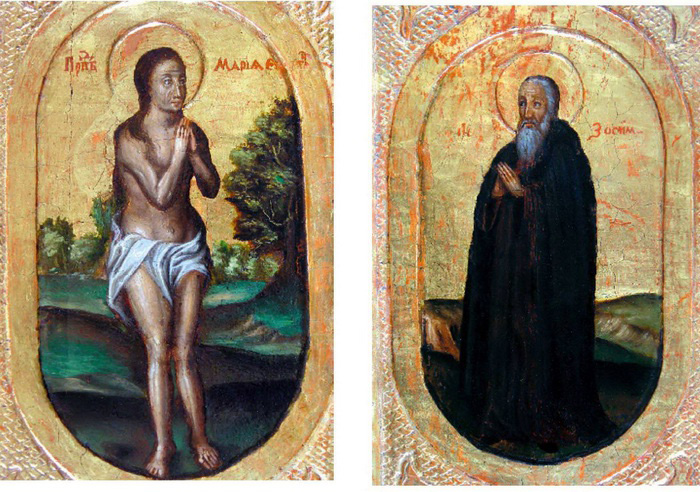
The Meeting of Mary of Egypt and Zosimas. Fragment of the iconostasis by Yov Kondzelevych for the Great Skete in Manyava (Ivano-Frankivsk Oblast, Ukraine), 1698–1705.

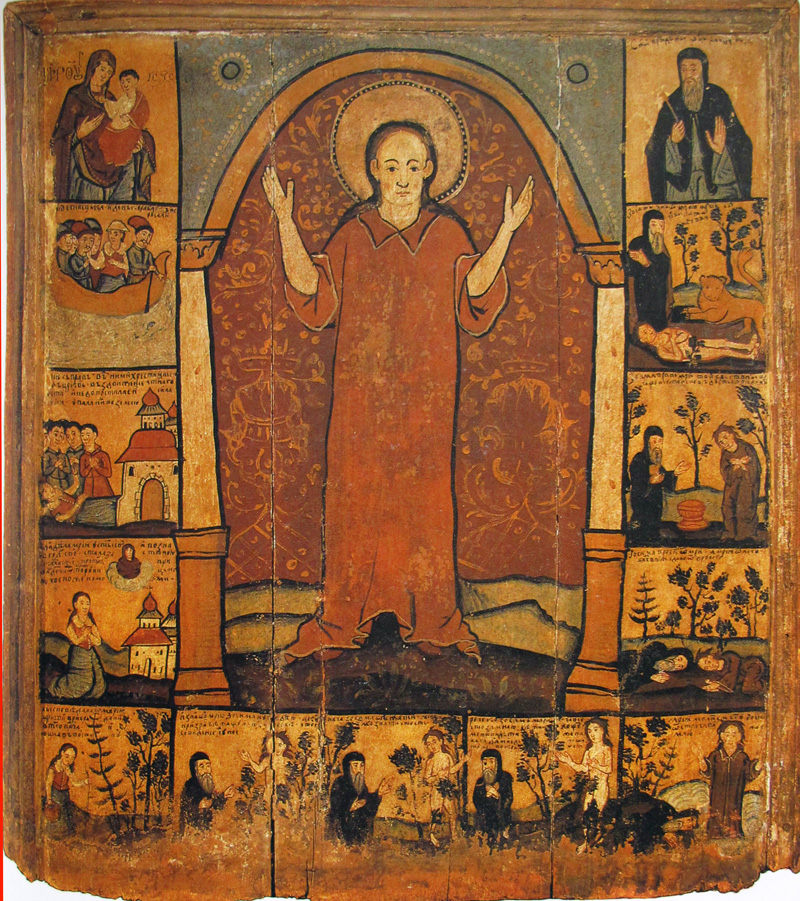
Mary of Egypt with her Life. Ukrainian icon, late 17th century. Liskowate village.

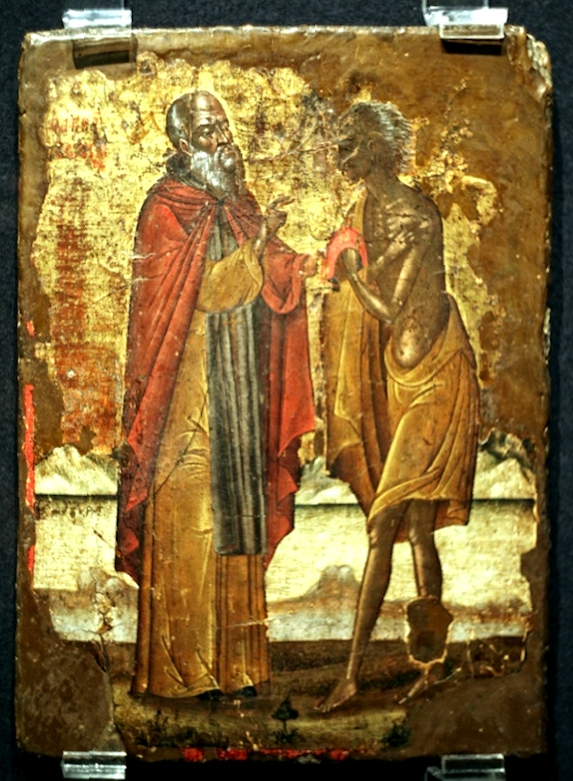
Abbas Zosimas and Mary of Egypt, 17th century, from the collection of the Alexander S. Onassis Foundation

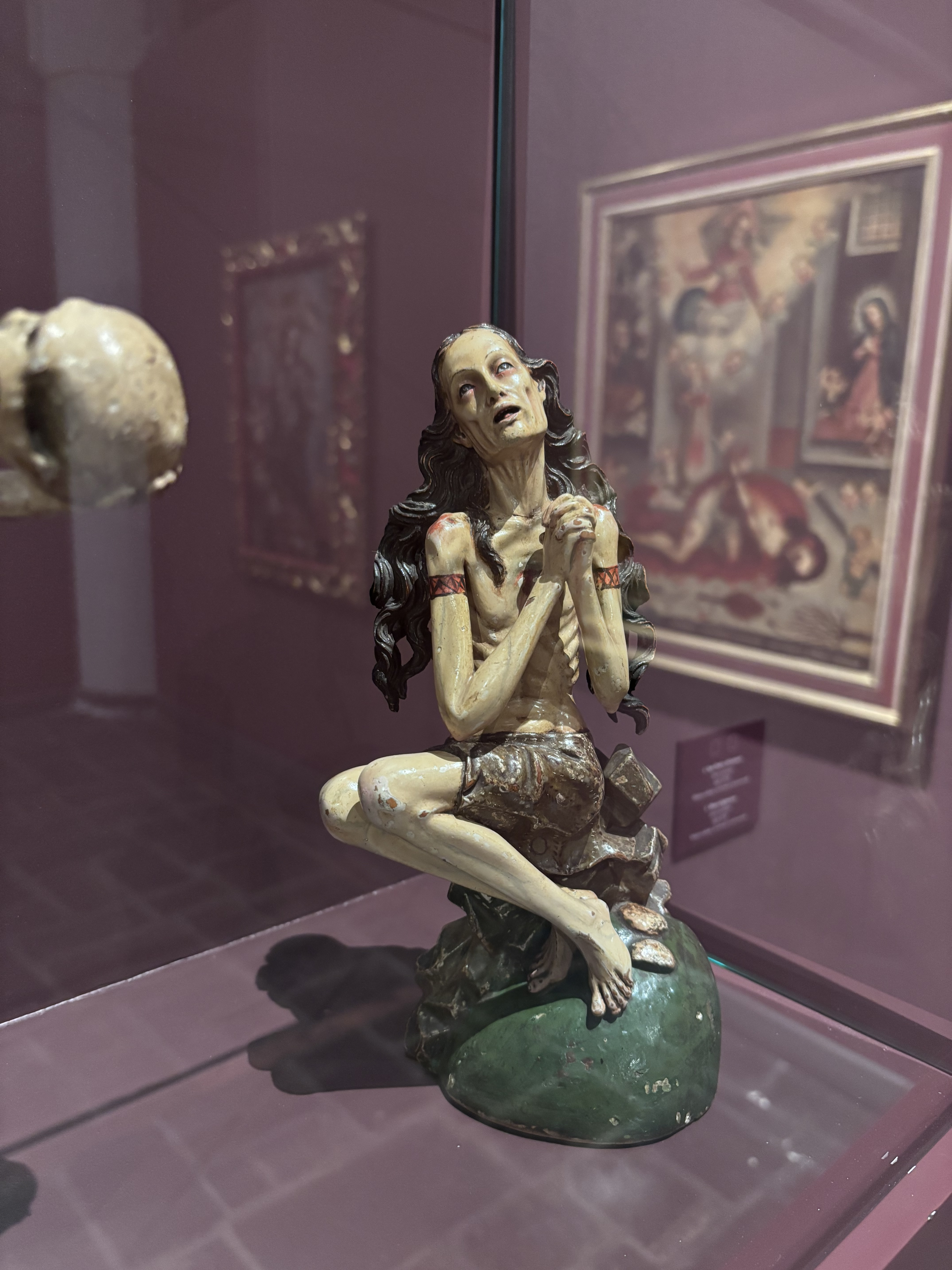
Carved wooden statuette (anonymous, 17th century) from the National Museum of Ecuador, Quito.

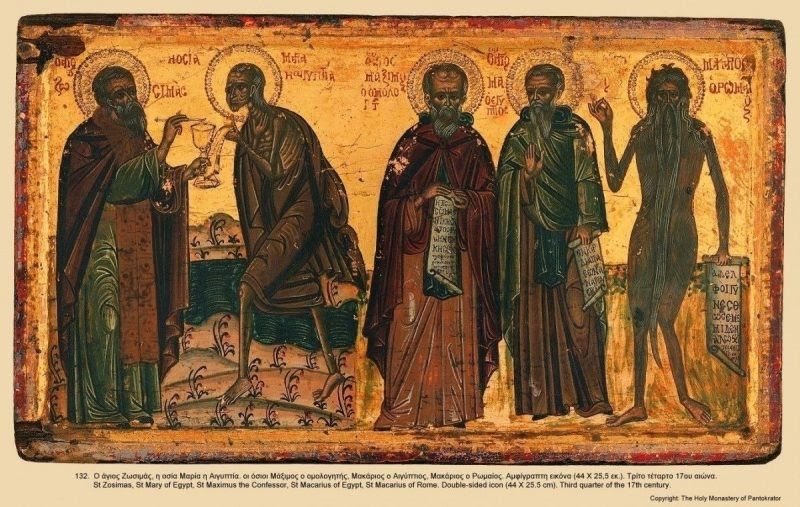
Saints Zosimas, Mary of Egypt, Maximus the Confessor, Macarius of Egypt, and Macarius of Alexandria. Icon, 17th century. Pantocrator. Mount Athos.

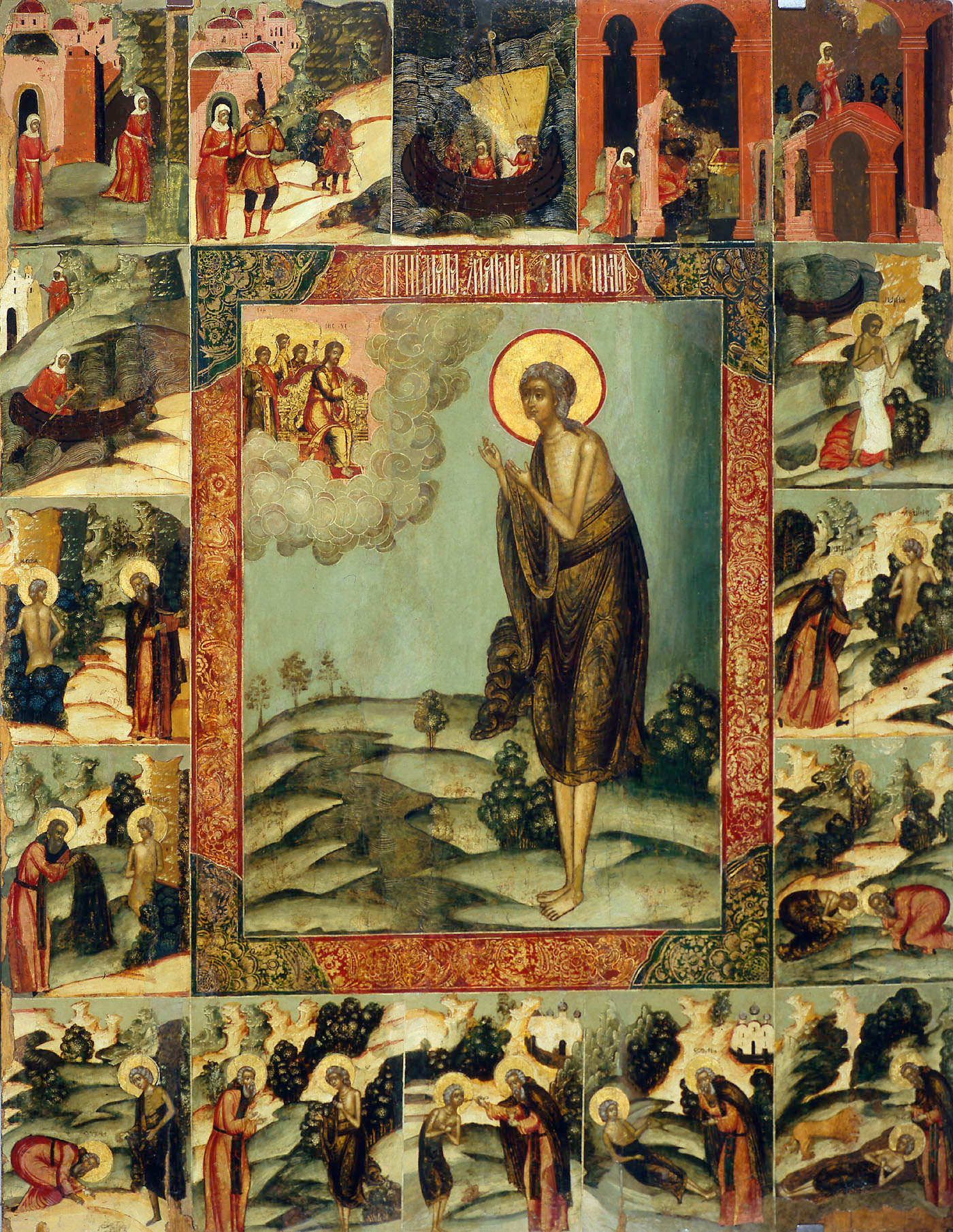
Icon of Saint Mary of Egypt, surrounded by scenes from her life (17th century, Bely Gorod).

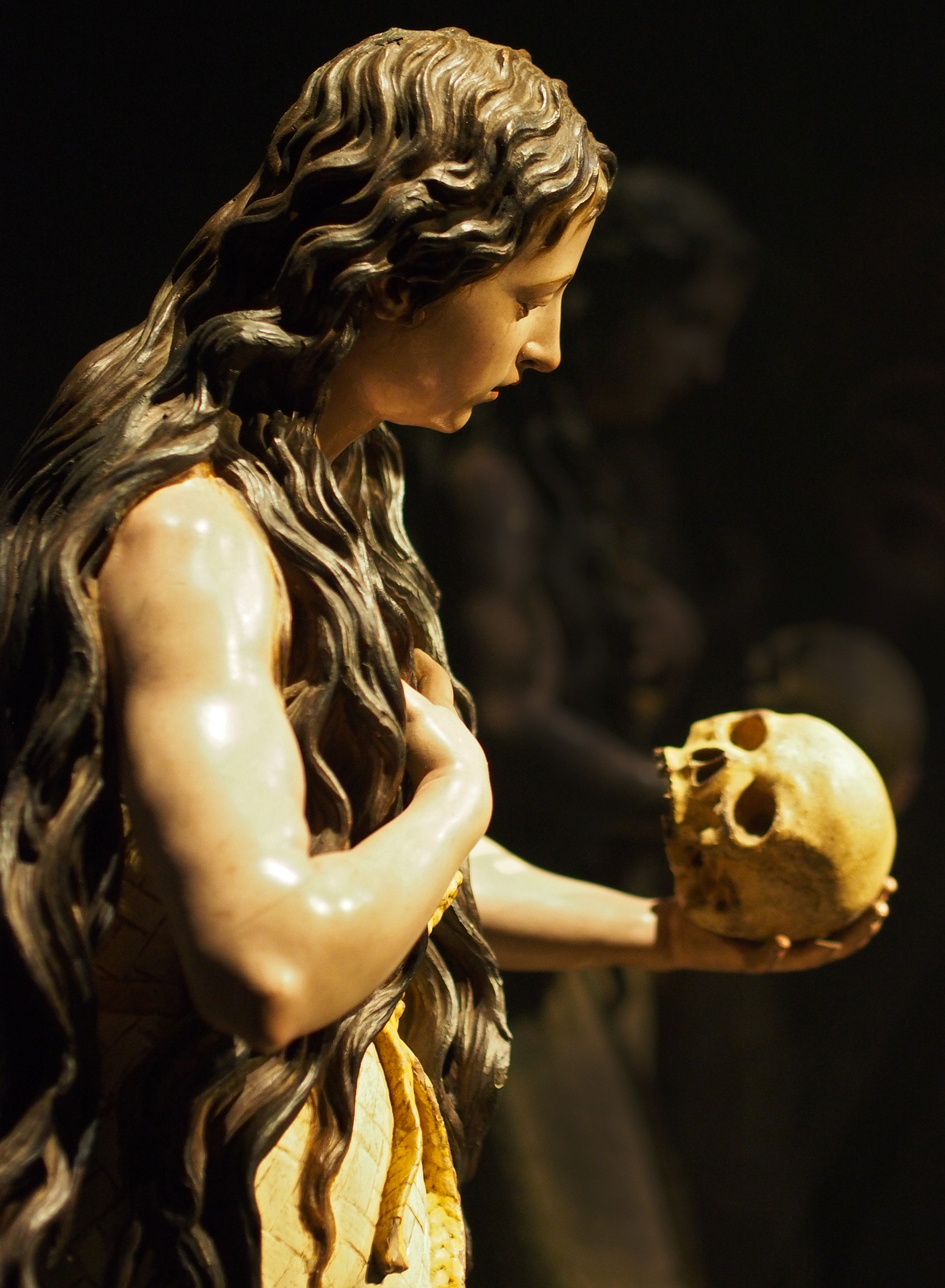
Luis Salvador Carmona (1708-1767). Saint Mary of Egypt. National Museum of Sculpture, Valladolid.

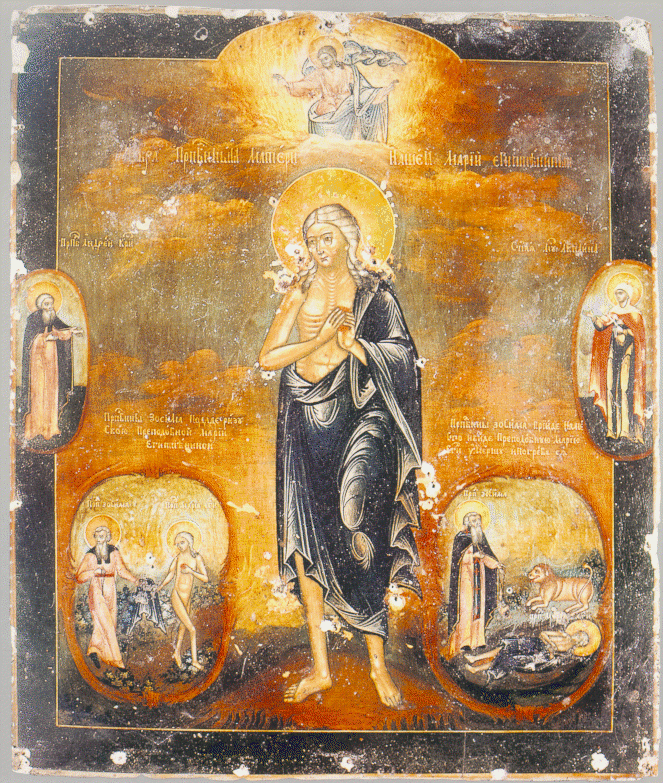
18th-century icon of St. Mary of Egypt. Kuopio Orthodox Church Museum. Finland

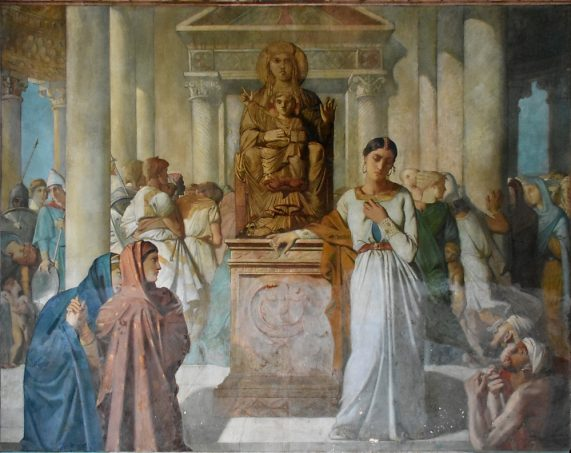
"The Conversion of Saint Mary of Egypt" by Théodore Chassériau (1843)

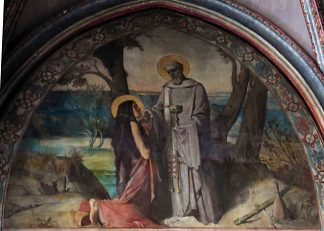
"The Communion of Saint Mary of Egypt" by Théodore Chassériau, 1843

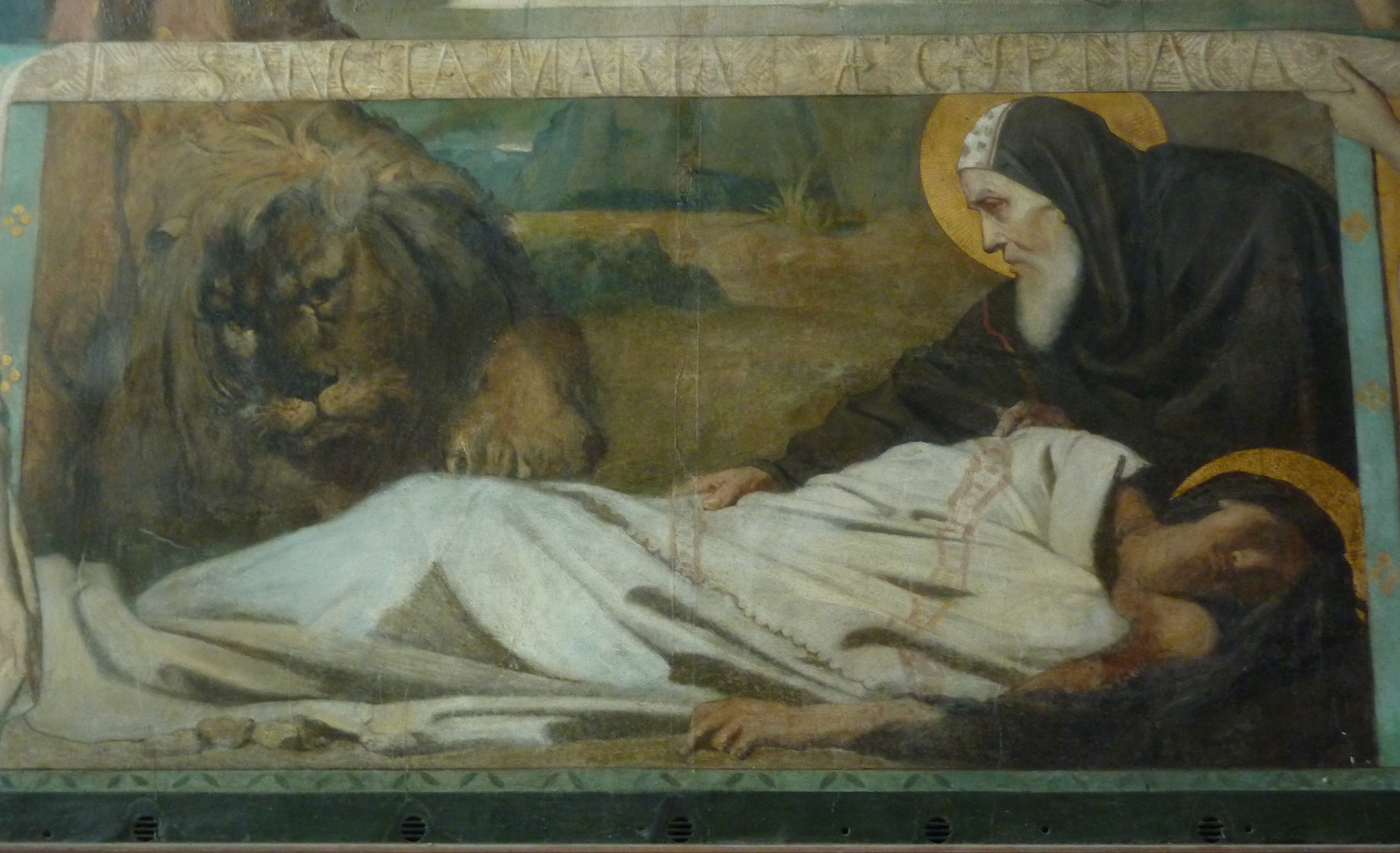
Fresco by Théodore Chassériau (1819–1856) from the third chapel of the northern ambulatory in Church of Saint-Merriy of Paris, depicting Mary of Egypt being buried by Saint Zosimas, with a lion digging her grave.

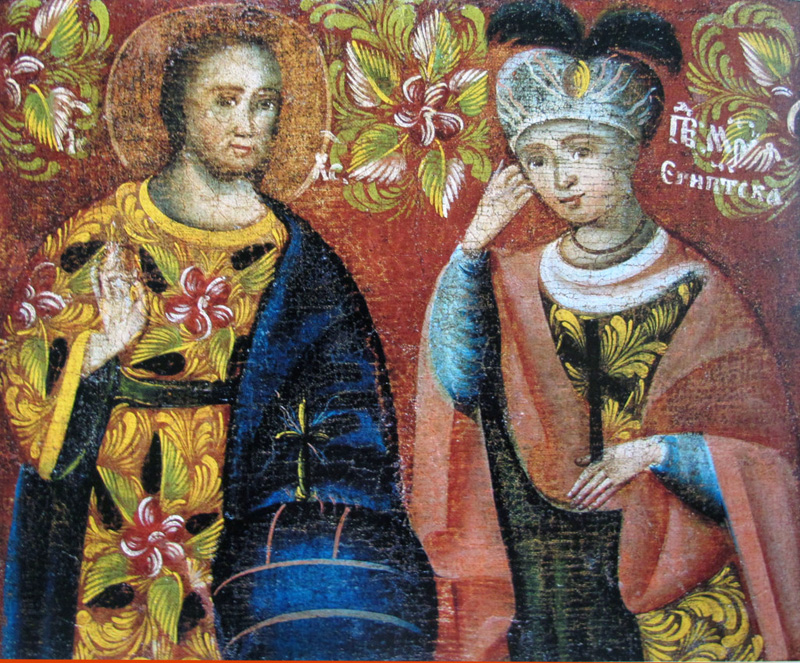
Christ and Mary of Egypt. Ukraine, Podillia region, second half of the 19th century.

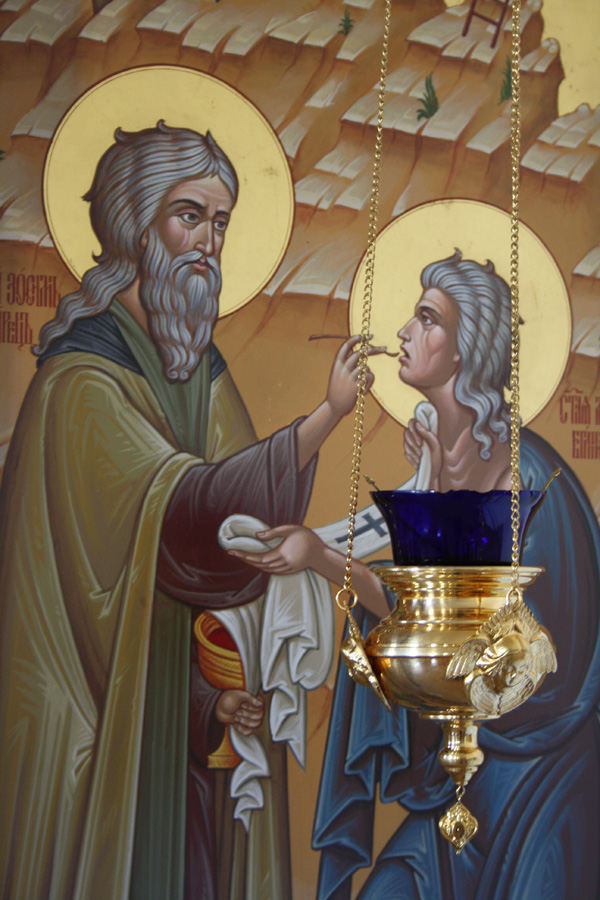
Icon of Mary of Egypt. Velyki Birky, Ukraine.

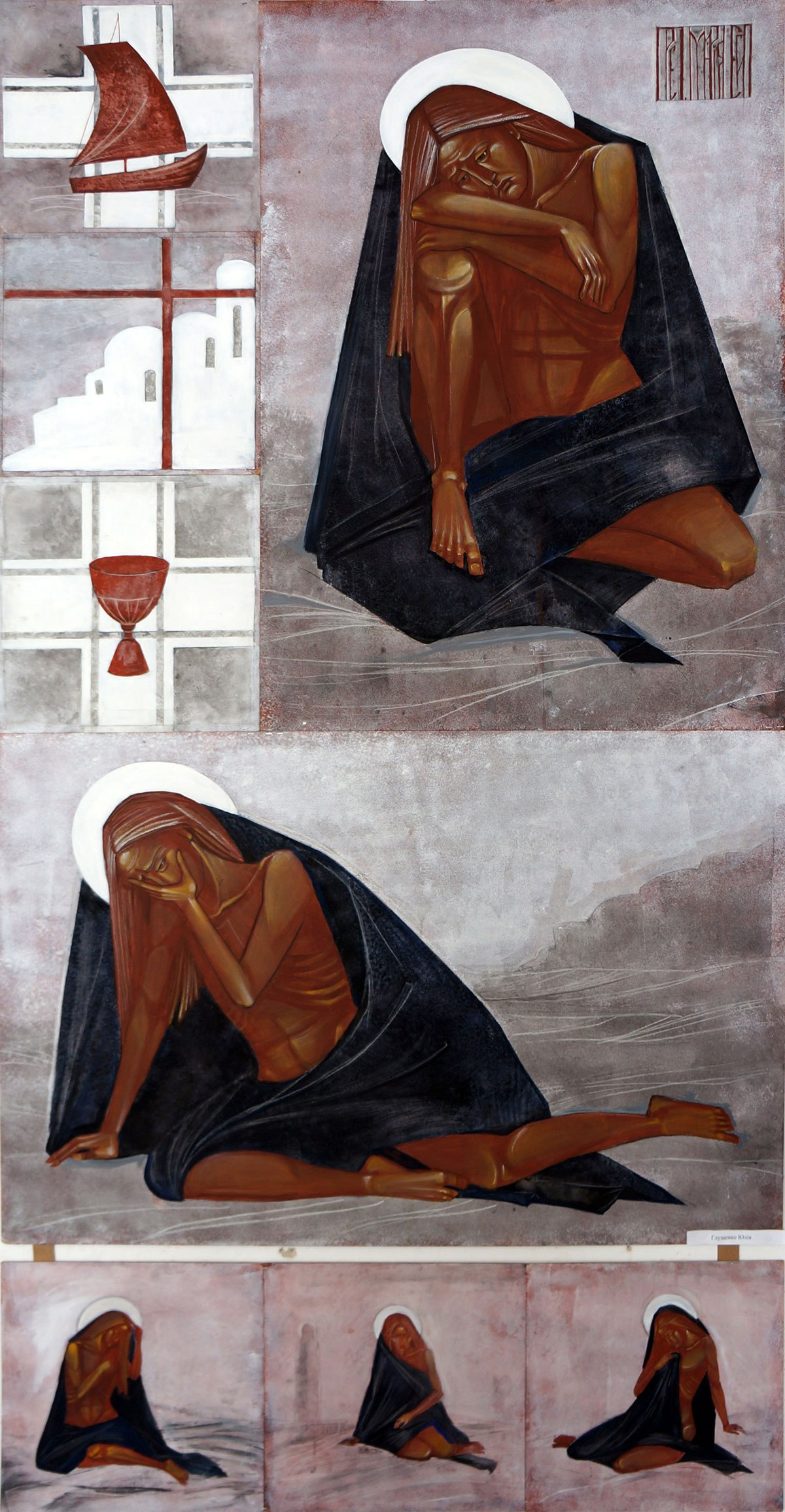
Mary of Egypt. Yuliia Hlushchenko, Department of Sacred Art, Lviv National Academy of Arts. Ukraine

Coat of arms of the town of Corte de Peleas, Badajoz, Spain incorporating an image of Mary of Egypt between two cypresses. Adopted by statute in 1992.

=== Commemorations ===
Her feast day is kept by Orthodox Christians and Greek Catholics, according to the Fixed Cycle, on 1 April, and, according to the Moveable Cycle, on the fifth Sunday of Great Lent, on which day it is customary for the priest to bless dried fruit after the Divine Liturgy. The Life of St Mary by Sophronius is appointed to be read during the Matins of the Great Canon of Andrew of Crete on the preceding Thursday, which is accompanied with a canon to her and Andrew sung after each ode of the Great Canon itself.

The Coptic Orthodox Church commemorates Saint Mary of Egypt on Parmouti 6, which is 14 April in the Gregorian calendar.

In the Roman Rite of the Catholic Church, Saint Mary of Egypt is commemorated on 1 April according to the 2004 Roman Martyrology (Ordinary Form) and on 2 April in the 1956 Roman Martyrology (Extraordinary Form).

She is venerated by Anglicans and appears on the Episcopal Church liturgical calendar.

=== Churches ===
There are a number of churches and chapels dedicated to Saint Mary of Egypt, among them:

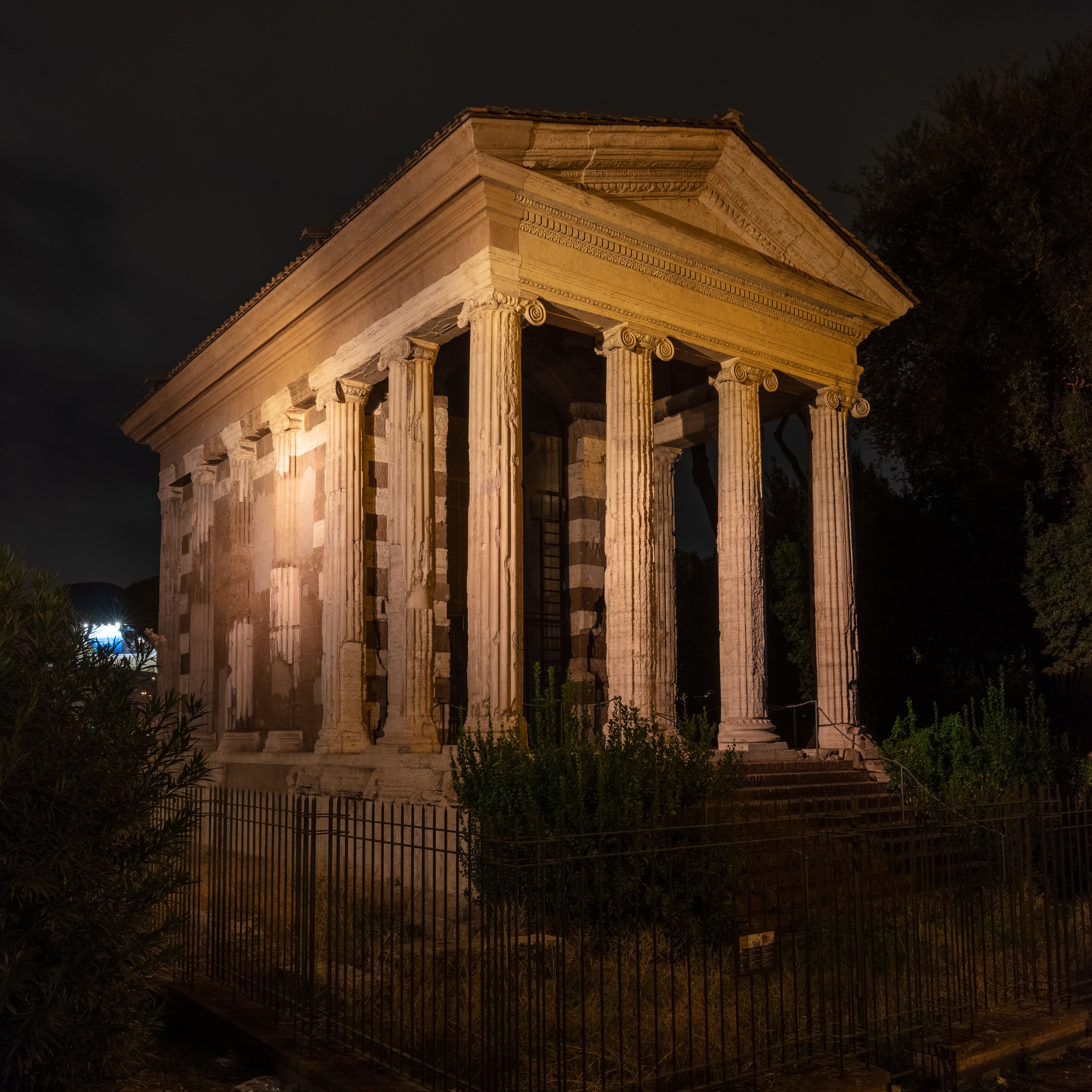
The Temple of Portunus, Rome, was preserved by being rededicated to Santa Maria Egiziaca in 872.

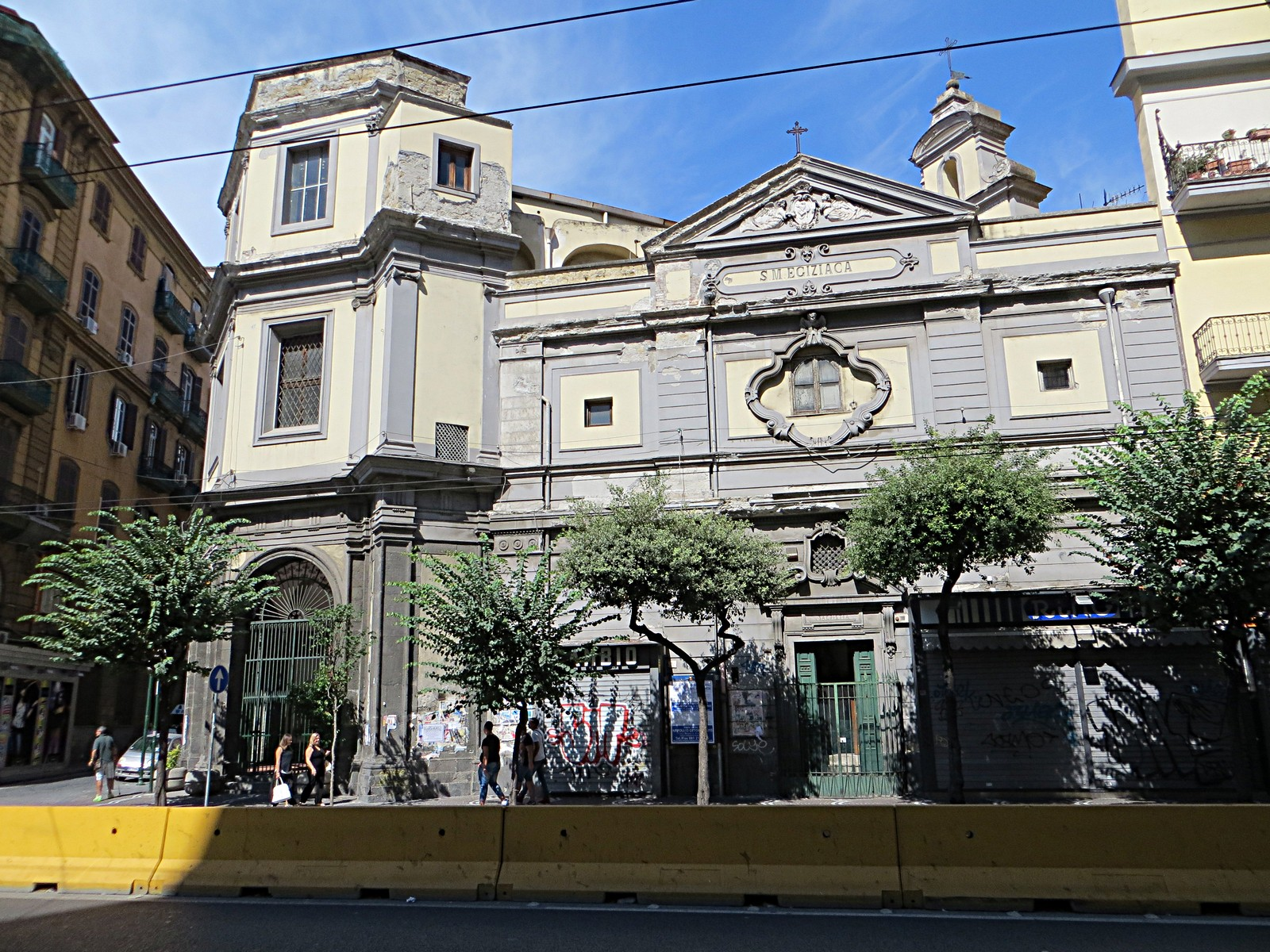
Church of Santa Maria Egiziaca a Forcella, Naples founded in 1342 to house repenting prostitutes.

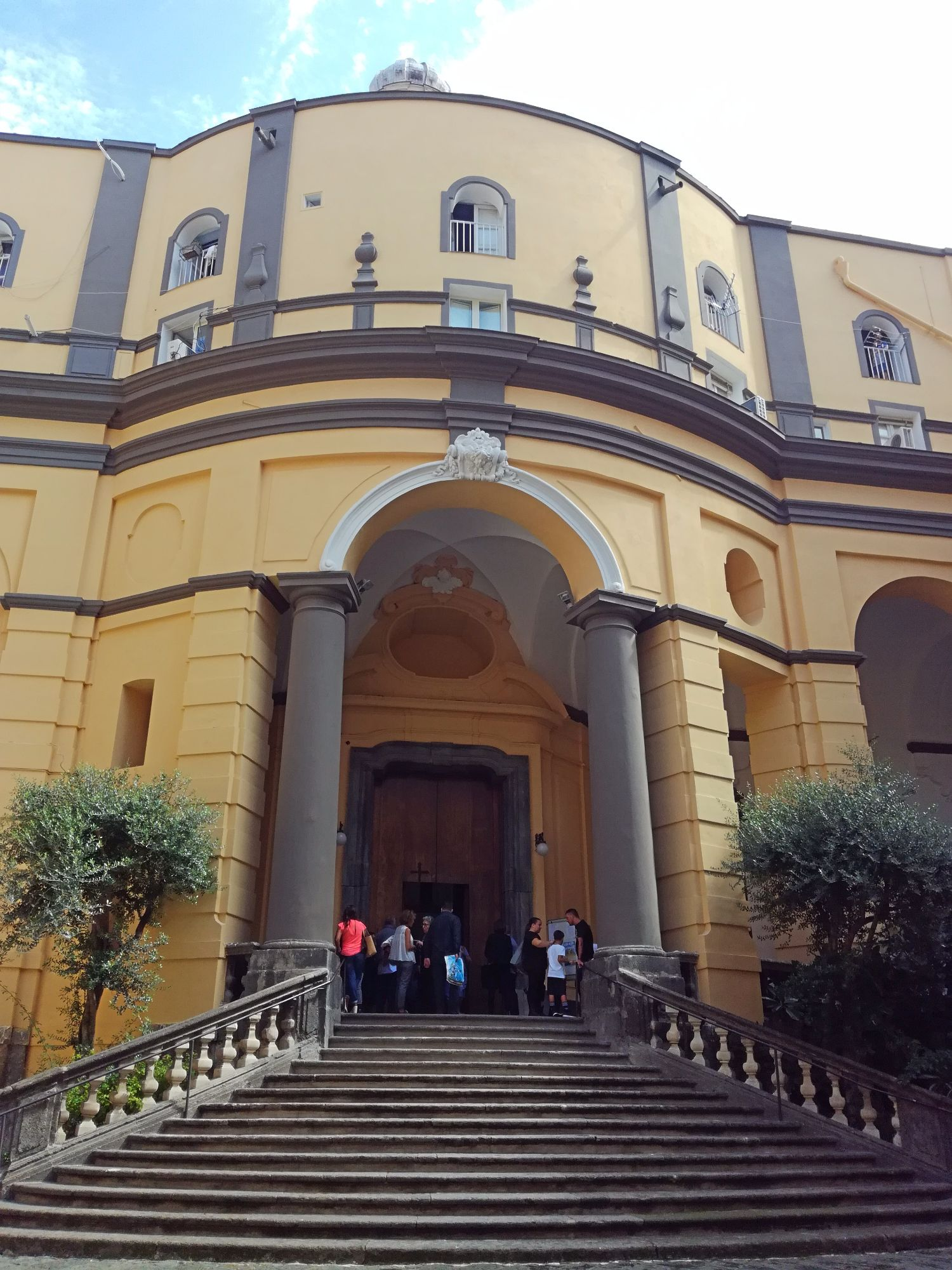
Church of Santa Maria Egiziaca a Pizzofalcone, Naples founded as a offshoot of the church at Forcella for a life closer to the cloistered ideal.

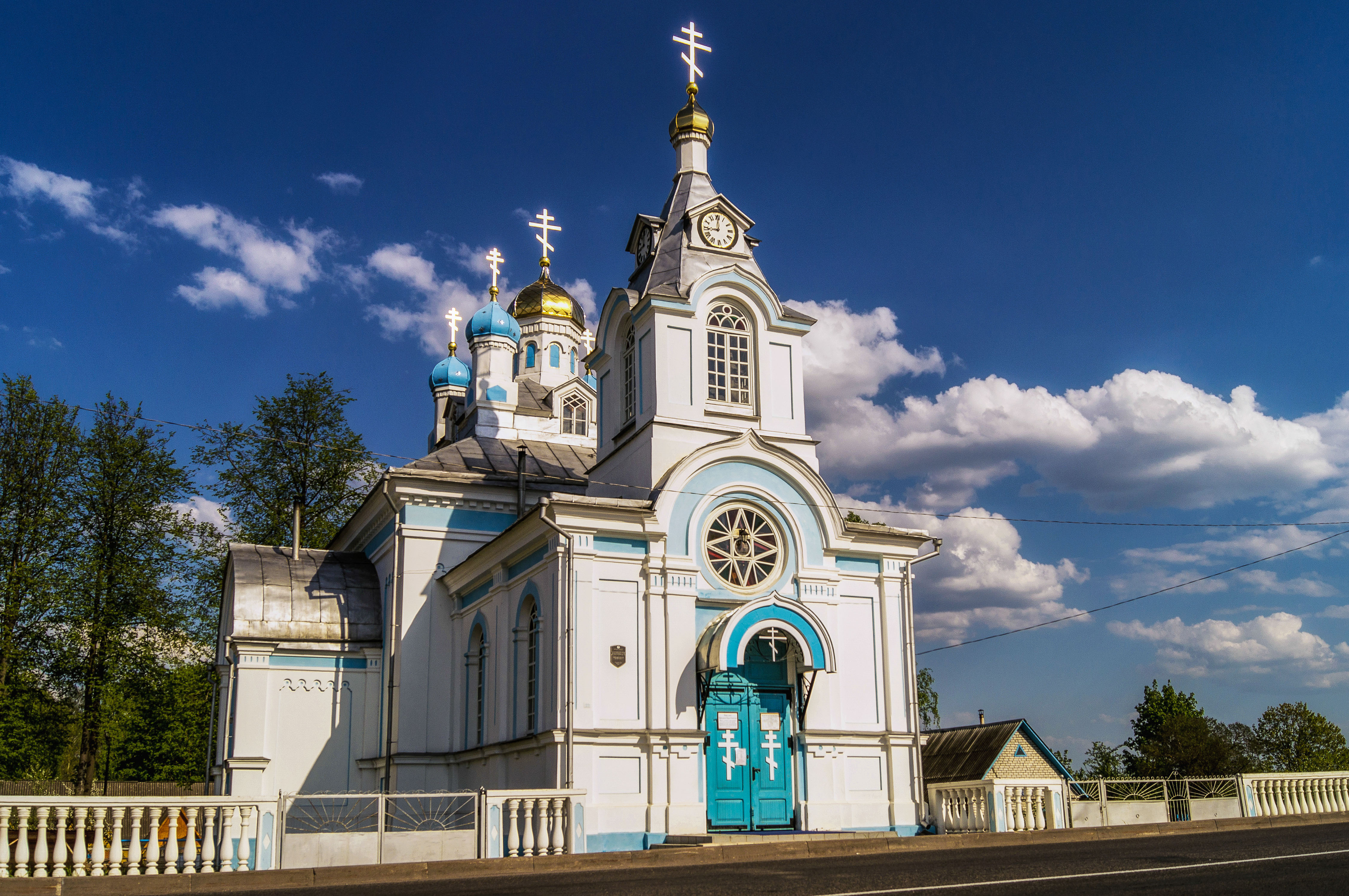
The Belarusian Orthodox Church of Saint Mary of Egypt in Vileyka, Belarus.

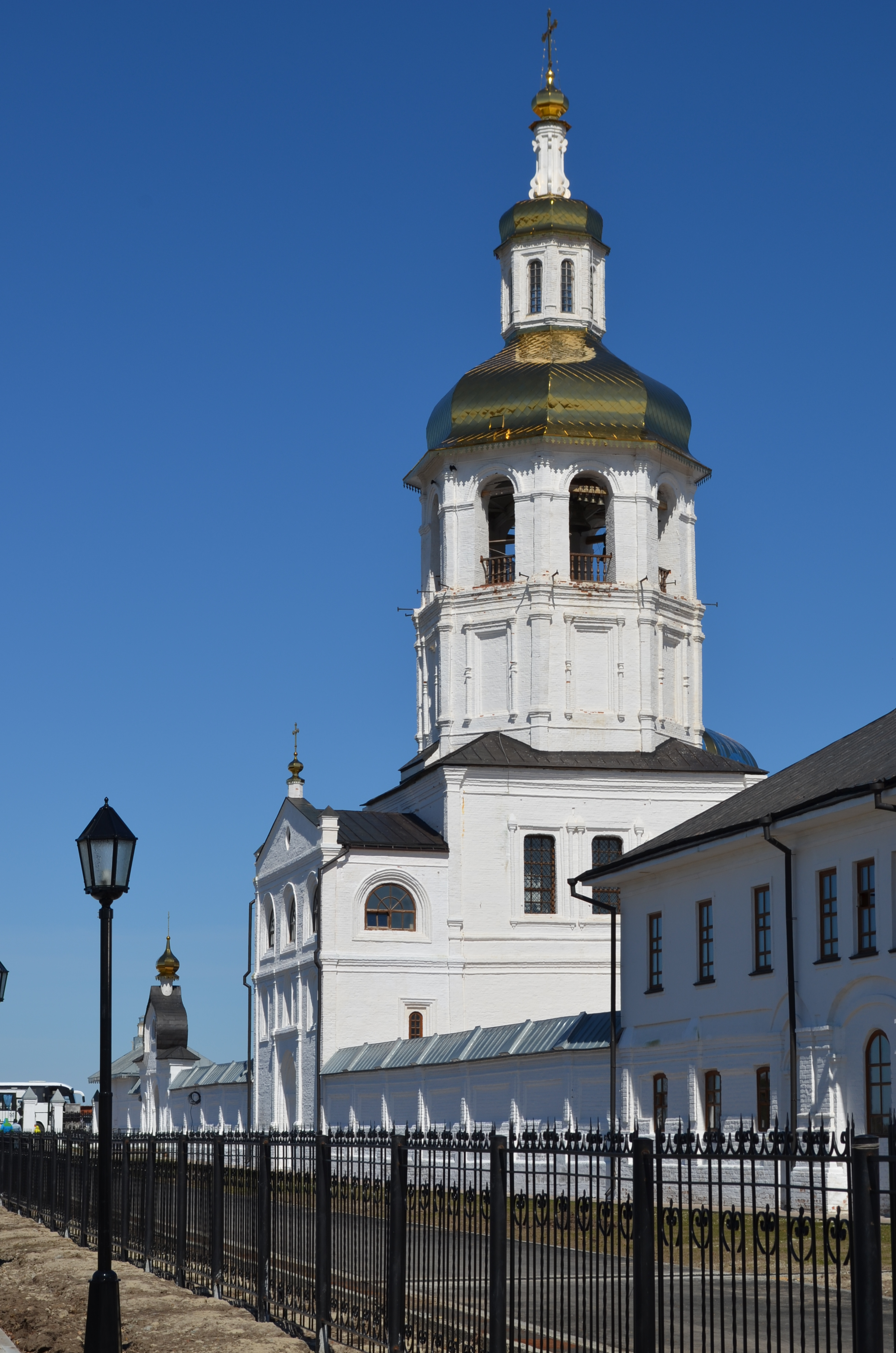
The Church of Mary of Egypt, part of the Monastery of Our Lady of the Sign complex in Abalak, Tyumen Oblast, Russia.

==== Chapels ====
- Chapel of St. Mary of Egypt, Wawel Castle, Kraków, Poland
- Chapel in Church of the Holy Sepulchre in Jerusalem, commemorating the site of her conversion.

=== Relics ===
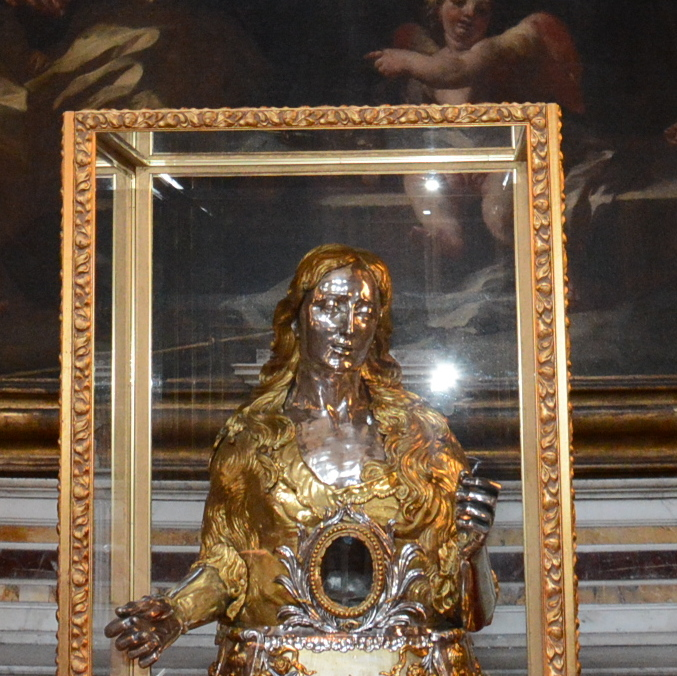
A silver and gilded copper reliquary bust of Saint Mary of Egypt (ca. 1690 - 1699) from Church of Santa Maria Egiziaca a Forcella

First-class relics of Saint Mary of Egypt are enshrined at the following churches:

==== Croatia ====
- Treasury Church of Saint Blaise, Vodnjan ("incorrupt" tongue)

==== France ====
- Sens Cathedral, Sens, France (right foot)

==== Greece ====
- Church of Agios Dimitrios, Ampelokipi, Greece

==== Italy ====
- Cathedral of Saint Mary of the Flower, Florence, Italy (fragment of her skull)
- Church of Santa Maria Egiziaca a Forcella, Naples, Italy (a relic encased in a bust of the saint)
- Royal Chapel of the Treasure of St. Januarius, Naples Cathedral, Italy (reliquary bust)
- Museum of the Medici Chapels at the Basilica of San Lorenzo, Florence, Italy (bone fragment in monumental reliquary)

==== Jordan ====
- The Holy Monastery of St John the Baptist on the Banks of the Jordan River, Qasr al-Yahud, Jordan

==== Russia ====
- Sretensky Monastery, Moscow, Russia (a particle from the right foot)
- Cathedral of Christ the Saviour, Moscow, Russia
- Novo-Tikhvin Monastery, Ekaterinburg, Russia
- Church of Saint Demetrios of Thessaloniki, Moscow, Russia (a particle of the right foot)

==== United States ====
- Sacred Patriarchal and Stavropegial Orthodox Monastery of St. Irene Chrysovalantou, Astoria, Queens, New York
- Saint Nicholas Russian Orthodox Monastery, Fort Myers, Florida, United States (particle)

=== Icon of the Mother of God ===
Two icons of the Theotokos are claimed to be the very icon before which Mary of Egypt prayed for forgiveness. One is kept in the Chapel of Saint James the Just, located on the western parvis of the Church of Holy Sepulchre. The other icon is located in the Cave of Saint Athanasios the Athonite, on the southern tip of Mount Athos.

=== Pilgrimage site ===
The cave believed to be the location where Mary of Egypt spent the rest her life following her conversion is a place of pilgrimage.

== Cultural references ==
=== Literature ===
In the Ben Jonson play Volpone (1606) one of the characters uses the expression "Marry Gip". Commentators have taken this to mean "Mary of Egypt".

Rosa Egipcíaca, an Afro-Brazilian religious mystic and formerly enslaved prostitute, renamed herself in 1798 to honour Saint Mary of Egypt. Egipcíaca was the first black woman in Brazil to write a book, Sagrada Teologia do Amor Divino das Almas Peregrinas ("Holy Theology of Divine Love of the Pilgrim Souls"), that recorded her religious visions.

In Goethe's Faust (1831), Mary of Egypt is one of the three penitent saints who pray to the Virgin Mary for forgiveness for Faust.

The Unknown Masterpiece (1831), a novella by Balzac, contains a long description of a portrait of Mary of Egypt "undressing in order to pay her passage to Jerusalem".

The Anatole France novel At the Sign of the Reine Pédauque (1892) contains comical banter about the nature of Mary of Egypt's sinfulness and saintliness.

Rainer Maria Rilke wrote the poem "Mary the Egypian" ("Die ägyptische Maria") in 1918.

"Thrust back by hands of air from the sanctuary door," is the first line of Maria Aegyptiaca (1963), a poem by John Heath-Stubbs about the saint.

In John Berryman's Pulitzer Prize winning book of poetry, The Dream Songs (1969), poem 47, subtitled "April Fool's Day, or, St. Mary of Egypt", recounts Mary of Egypt's walk across the River Jordan.

Nalo Hopkinson's science fiction novel, The Salt Roads (2003) features Mary of Egypt and takes a historical fiction approach to telling her story.

=== Music ===
In the 18th century, Baroque-era composer Francesco Gasparini wrote La penitenza gloriosa nella conversione di S. Maria Egiziaca, an oratorio.

Mahler's 8th Symphony (1910) uses the Mary of Egypt's appeal to the Mater Gloriosa from Faust.

Mary of Egypt is the titular subject of several 20th-century operas:

- Ottorino Respighi's Maria egiziaca (1932)
- Sir John Tavener's Mary of Egypt (1992)
- John Craton's Saint Mary of Egypt (2021)

== See also ==
- Desert Mothers
- Syncletica of Alexandria
- Saint Mary of Egypt, patron saint archive
- Sarah of the Desert
- Margaret of Cortona
- Paula of Rome
