= Zosimas of Palestine =

Palestinian saint

Saint Saint Zosimus of Palestine
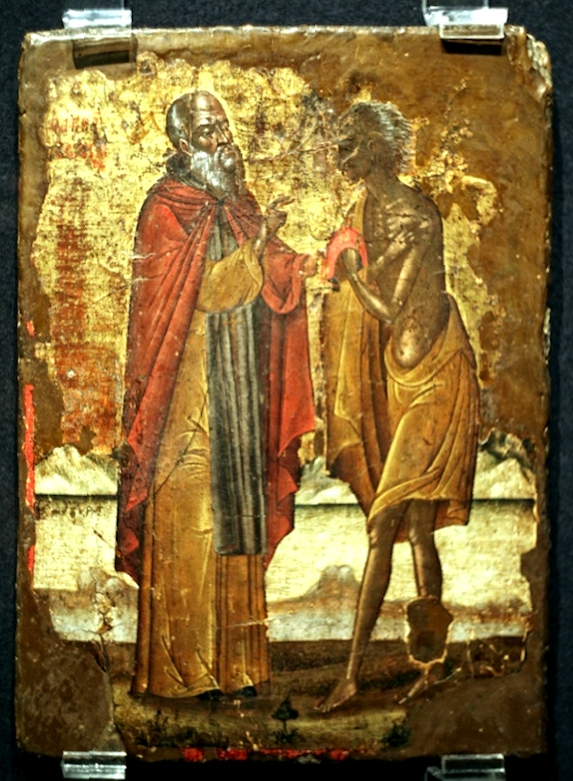

Venerable (Monk)
- Born: c. 460; Palaestina Prima, Diocese of the East (Byzantine Empire)
- Died: c. 560; Palaestina Prima, Diocese of the East (Byzantine Empire)
- Venerated in: Eastern Orthodox Church; Oriental Orthodox Churches; Roman Catholic Church
- Feast: 4 April

Zosimas of Palestine (Greek: Ζωσιμᾶς; Arabic: زوسيماس الفلسطيني, romanized: Zōsīmas al-Falesṭīnī), is commemorated as a Palestinian saint. His feast day is on 4 April.

== Biography ==
Zosimas was born in the second half of the fifth century, during the reign of Emperor Theodosius II. He became a monk in a monastery in Palestine at a very young age, gaining a reputation as a great elder and ascetic. At the age of fifty-three, now a hieromonk, he moved to a very strict monastery located in the wilderness close to the Jordan River, where he spent the remainder of his life.

He is best known for his encounter with Mary of Egypt (commemorated on 1 April). It was the custom of that monastery for all of the brethren to go out into the desert for the forty days of Great Lent, spending the time in fasting and prayer, and not returning until Palm Sunday. While wandering in the desert he met Mary, who told him her life story and asked him to meet her the next year on Holy Thursday on the banks of the Jordan, in order to bring her Holy Communion. He did so, and the third year came to her again in the desert, but he found that she had died and he buried her. Zosimas is reputed to have lived to be almost one hundred years of age.

All that is known of Zosimas' life comes from the Vita of St. Mary of Egypt, recorded by Sophronius, who was the Patriarch of Jerusalem from 634 to 638. Sophronius based his work on oral tradition he had heard from monks in Palestine. This Vita is traditionally read as a part of the Matins of the Great Canon of Andrew of Crete, on the fifth Thursday of Great Lent.

The story shares many similarities with one recorded in the Western church as a story of Mary Magdalene, with Zosimas renamed as Maximin, as recounted in the Golden Legend and elsewhere. The fresco illustrated by Giotto and his workshop in Assisi, shows this version.
