= Grande loge de la troupe des Cinq-Nations =

19th-century French travelling fairground theatre

- Nickname: Troupe des Arabes; Grande Troupe Arabe; Théâtre Arabe; Théâtre Bracco-Moustapha
- Founded: c. 1850s
- Founders: Mustapha Amar; Joseph Bracco
- Dissolved: c. 1880s
- Type: Travelling theatre troupe
- Headquarters: France
- Members: Saïd Ben Mohamed
- Affiliations: Théâtre Saïd

Grande loge de la troupe des Cinq-Nations, alternatively named Troupe des Arabes, Grande Troupe Arabe and Théâtre Arabe, was a troupe of around forty Touareg, Kabyle, Italian, French and Anglo-American acrobats formed in the 1850s by Mustapha Amar and Joseph Bracco in France.

== History ==
On 29 June 1850, the Cirque des Champs-Elysées presented an "extraordinary troupe of nine Kabyle acrobats who arrived in Paris just a few days ago". The acrobats were often described in posters and newspapers as being Arab, Tuareg, or Kabyle, while they were often Moroccan artists who perform human pyramid or aerial acts on the stages of European circuses.

Mustapha Amar (Ben-Bel-Aïd), who was part of the troupe performing in Paris, was hired by Italian circus director Joseph Bracco and together Mustapha and Bracco became the directors of the troupe. They named their troupe Grande loge de la troupe des Cinq-Nations, alternatively Troupe des Arabes, Grande Troupe Arabe, and Théâtre Arabe. They used to often carry the subtitle du Mont Atlas and later Les Merveilles du Desert.

A review of a performance by a "Troupe des Arabes du Sahara" in Bourges in January 1853 described many of the acts later associated with the company, including somersaulting acrobats, a dagger-jumping act, and a human pyramid of six people supported by a strongman compared to Atlas. The reviewer noted having seen the same troupe previously in 1851, suggesting that a troupe of Arab acrobats was active several years before the earliest documented appearances.

One of the earliest documented references to the company appears in Metz in May 1853, where a newspaper mentions the Troupe des Arabes being directed by Mister Bracco. The same notice announced a benefit performance for the "intrepid Moustapha", featuring a large-scale military spectacle involving eighty participants.

The programme published in 1857 describes the Troupe des Arabes du Mont Atlas et des Bouffes Anglais under the direction of Mister Bracco. The programme already included acts that would remain associated with the company for decades, including Les Pyramides de Cristal and a concluding Grande Pantomime. The troupe was said to consist of thirty-eight performers.

In 1865, Joseph Bracco advertised the Troupe des Arabes Touaregs Kabyles at the Calais fair. In an open letter to the public of Calais, he stated that he had previously appeared there two years earlier and returned with an enlarged troupe of "artists of the highest merit", encouraged by the welcome he was given, and by the many letters sent to him by several members of the public, he says to "return among old friends". The fairground theatre was described as enclosed, heated and illuminated by 200 gas burners which indicates the size.

The last known press mention is from 1885. The troupe was advertising itself as the "true Arab Theatre" of Bracco and Mustapha and explicitly warned audiences not to confuse it with other acrobatic theatres. This suggests that competing travelling companies were presenting similar "Arab" spectacles during the same period. The company is described as consisting of forty performers together with trained dogs, goats, and pigs. The travelling theatre reportedly accommodated 1,000 spectators, was illuminated by 200 gas burners, and required nine railway wagons to transport its equipment and structure. The article also noted that the troupe had previously performed in Nîmes two years earlier, indicating a return engagement.

In 1890 a newspaper item mentions that the formerly known Théâtre Bracco-Moustapha was performing as Théâtre Saïd.

== Acts ==
The circus consisted of several acts and acrobats.

=== Acrobatic acts ===
- LES PYRAMIDES DE CRISTAL

In the 1857 programme this act is described as an exercise of the highest difficulty. As per the 1875 programme, this act was performed by the young Bracco.

- LES ÉCHELLES AMÉRICAINES

This ladderact is described in the 1875 programme as a new act, created and first performed at the Cirque Napoléon by the Anglo-American performers.

In another programme and an 1873 newspaper the act is named the "GRAND TRAVAIL DES ECHELLES ANGLO-AMERICAINES", and described as being performed by several artists of the Anglo-American troupe and by the Bracco brothers.

- Le reck américain

Mentioned in the 1883 article.

- les cordages américains

Mentioned in the 1867 review, this balancing act was performed by Isodore.

- L'HOMME AU TAMBOUR

This act was featured on the programme published in 1857. It is described as a gymnastic performance by Joseph Bracco.

- Le Tambour Aerien

This act described on their programme and an 1873 newspaper was performed by the young Adolphe.

- LA BARRE FIXE

Performed by Adolphe Bracco, this act was described as dizzying and unforgettable on the programme and 1873 newspaper. In 1875 the act was performed by Francis de Madrid.

- LE TOURNIQUET

According to the programme and an 1873 newspaper this act is performed by Colombe, a spanish gymnast.

- Le Double Trapèze

This act was part of the 1875 programme and is there described as being performed by Charles and Henri. Another programme mentions the young Adolphe and Eugene as performers. It is also part of the 1883 article.

=== Strength acts ===
- LES PYRAMIDES HUMAINES

Their programme features an image of the human pyramid. It is described as being performed by the Arab Troupe and Mustapha. Mustapha is described as the one "who will distinguish himself every day by his muscular strength; he will finish his marvellous exercises by carrying a group of ten people on his sturdy shoulders". In 1860 the act carried the name "les grandes pyramides arabes" and was performed by the full Arab troupe. In 1883 "La pyramide de la troupe arabe" was performed at the end of the show.

- LES COLONNES DU TEMPLE DE JÉRUSALEM

The act "Columns of the temple of Jerusalem" was performed by all the Touareg artists as per the 1875 programme. The act is illustrated. It features Mustapha, known as le Samson du Désert, who demonstrated his muscular strength by carrying a group of ten people on his shoulders. A 1869 review highlights this act as the one that attracted the greatest attention: "The final tableau is especially worthy of attention: ten persons are stacked one upon another on the shoulders of the extremely sturdy Mustapha".

- La jeune fille la plus forte du monde

A newspaper in 1882 describes miss C. Dupaty as the strongest young woman in the world. Her act features her muscular strength and her skill in handling cast-iron and steel weights—feats which as the article describes until now have been regarded as the exclusive domain of men and of Hercules. It features the manipulation of a phenomenal dumbbell of enormous size and weight, as well as a cast-steel cannon weighing 150 kilograms.

- LES DEUX GLADIATEURS

The "two gladiators" was according to the programme an 1873 newspaper performed by Adolphe Bracco and Eugene Said.

=== Balancing acts ===
- L'HOMME A LA BOULE

The programme and an 1873 newspaper describes Louis Bracco performing "the ball man", a ball balancing act. The act is described as coming from the Hippodrome.

- La mappemonde

An 1868 review highlights Mr. Louis performing on the globe, where he carried out his gymnastic exercises with great agility and dexterity.

- LE TONNEAU MAGIQUE

As per the 1875 programme, this act was performed by M. L.

- BALLON ET TAMBOURIN

Described as difficult on the programme in an 1873 newspaper, this act was performed by the elder Bracco.

- MARCHE SUR LA MAIN PENDUE

According to the 1875 programme, either this act, or "LA MERVEILLE DE LA STATIQUE" was performed during the show, by the elder Bracco. It translates to "walking on the suspended hand".

- LA MERVEILLE DE LA STATIQUE

According to the 1875 programme, either this act, or "MARCHE SUR LA MAIN PENDUE" was performed during the show, by the elder Bracco. It translates to "the wonder of static balance".

- LE GLOBE MERVEILLEUX

This act is featured on the 1875 programme and has the subtitle "Ou la manière de remplacer les mains par les pied". Translated it means the marvelous globe, how to replace the hands with the feet. It was performed by Pierre Bracco.

- les exercices d’équilibre et de bracopédestrianisme

Mentioned in the 1867 review, this balancing act was performed by Francis and Bracco junior.

- Les équilibres de chaises

Mentioned in the 1883 article.

=== Arabian and African themed acts ===
- La Fantasia arabe

Listed on their programme and an 1873 newspaper, the "arabian fantasy" was performed by Arabian and Kabyle performers.

- Le Moulinet du fusil Arabe et le Saut des Poignarts

This act was performed by Saïd Mahomet, father of Emma Saïd Ben Mohamed and greatgrandfather of Édith Piaf. His stage name was le Petit sans Pareil, literally meaning the little incomparable one. He is described as such on the programme.

His act consisted of "le Moulinet du fusil Arabe", meaning the lightning-fast spinning of an Arab rifle. A contemporary review of the Troupe des Arabes at the Foire du Trône (1877) singled out Saïd's rifle-manipulation act as "the most remarkable part of the performance", describing him as performing "a thousand feats of dexterity" with an Arab rifle while the troupe answered his cries in chorus.

Another part of his act was "le Saut des Poignards", a daggerleap, which is an acrobatic act in which daggers are on the ground and the acrobat jumps over or between them.

- Le Saut des animaux du desert - La course de la Gazelle

Listed on their programme and an 1874 newspaper, the "The Gazelle Race, a desert-animal jumping act" was performed by the entire troupe of Arab performers.

- Le travail des touaregs-kabyles

Mentioned in the 1883 article.

=== Animal acts ===
- ROCAMBOLE: TIGRE ET PANTHERE

This act described on the programme and an 1873 newspaper included trained dogs and was presented by Louis Bracco.

- LA CHIENNE FLORE

This dog act, Flore the dog, is described on the programme as being trained and presented by Louis. Another programme in an 1873 newspaper describes that Flore, during the winters of 1869–70, performed at the Théâtre de la Gaîté in Paris in the fairy spectacle La Chatte Blanche, where she achieved outstanding success every evening for six months.

- Le travail des chiens dressés

The "trained dogs act" was performed by Bracco in 1883.

=== Dance acts ===
- LA COCHINCHINOISE: BALLET COMIQUE

The "girl from Cochinchina: a comic ballet" was according to the programme and an 1873 newspaper performed by the Anglo-American performers.

- LA KOLOKAKAO

Described in the 1875 programme as a Cochinchinese festival/ballet performed by the American artists.

- LA RENCONTRE DE LARFAILLOU & CLAUDINE

The programme from 1875 describes a Breton dance performed by Miss Laurence and Louis Bracco.

- LA BRETONNE

On the in 1857 published programme, the Breton girl was described as a comic dance.

- GRAND PAS DE DEUX

This act is featured on the 1857 programme and is described as a character dance.

=== Contortion acts ===
- L'HOMME SERPENT

In 1875 the "snake man" was performed by Charles, described as an exceptional contortionist by the programme.

In 1883 it was performed by Waring.

- LE CELEBRE CAOUTCHOUC

Described by his stage name le serpent du Desert, the rubberman was performed by the young Antony.

=== Specialty acts ===
- Le Triomphe de Bacchus

Listed on their programme and an 1873 newspaper, the "Triumph of Bacchus" is performed by Adolphe Hablad.

- LE VÉLOCIPÈDE SANS PAREIL

This act was performed by a 5 year old child, on a vélocipède with two wheels.

- LA TRANKA HISPAGNOLA

This act is described on the 1875 programme as being performed by the "cadet" Bracco, meaning the younger Bracco.

On another programme and an 1873 newspaper the act is advertised as "LA TRANKA ESPAGNOLE" and was performed by the elder Bracco.

- La Bataille d'Isly

This act was described in 1853, featuring the historical reanactment of the 1844 battle of Isly. It was a large-scale military spectacle involving eighty participants, both French and Arab performers. This act was the closing performance and was a benefit for Moustapha.

=== Comedic acts ===
- GRANDE PANTOMIME

The show concluded with grand pantomime and was already part of the programme in 1857. Alternatively named "grande pantomime comique", "PANTOMIME COMIQUE" and "Les Pantomimes Comiques", or translated comical pantomimes. According to the 1875 programme the performance featured grand parades and comical scenes by Bastien-Frise-Poulet, principal comedian of the Paris fairs.

Another programme and article describe the performance containing mime by the Bracco family. The same programme and another newspaper article from 1867 features the role of Pierrot played by Louis Bracco (described as Debureau's only successor). His mime is described as famous and hilarious as ever in 1884.

Every evening the spectacle is described as different and the pantomime as new.

- Le Coffre Magique

This act is first mentioned in 1860 and fully named "Le Coffre Magique ou le Notaire dans l'embarras". It featured Kaufmann in the roll of Harlequin (d'Arlequin) and Joséphine as Colombine. This act was alternatively named "Le Coffre de Fer" and described as "charmante Pantomime comique" in 1869. It contained an iron chest and an amusing notary in distress.

- Intermèdes

In 1873, the intermèdes meaning intervals, were described as highly amusing and comical in a review. According to a 1882 newspaper, the intervals were filled by Mr. Friquet, comedian of the troupe.

== Performers ==
Contemporary advertisements, newspaper reports and programmes describe the troupe as an international company of approximately forty performers, including acrobats, gymnasts, dancers and pantomime. The following performers are documented.

Performer	Stage name	Repertoire	Years	Source(s)
Adolphe le jeune	-	le tambour aerien le double trapèze	1873	
Antony le jeune	le serpent du Desert	le celebre caoutchouc	-	
Adolphe Bracco	-	la barre fixe les deux gladiateurs	1873	
Bracco ainé	-	la tranka espagnole marche sur la main pendue la merveille de la statique ballon et tambourin	1873 1875	
Bracco cadet/fils	-	la tranka hispagnola les pyramides de cristal les exercices d’équilibre et de bracopédestrianisme	1867 1875	
Bracco, la famille	-	pantomime comique	1882	
Bracco, les frères	-	grand travail des échelles	1873	
Joseph Bracco		l'homme au tambour	1857	
Louis Bracco	-	l'homme a la boule la rencontre de larfaillou & claudine rocambole: tigre et panthere la chienne flore le travail des chiens dressés grande pantomime Pierrot	1867 1873 1875 1883 1884	
Pierre Bracco	-	le globe merveilleux	1875	
Charles	-	l'homme serpent le double trapèze	1875	
Colombe	-	le tourniquet	1873	
C. Dupaty	-	La jeune fille la plus forte du monde	1882	
Eugene	-	le double trapèze	-	
Francis	-	les exercices d’équilibre et de bracopédestrianisme	1867	
Friquet	-	intermèdes	1882	
Adolphe Hablad	-	le triomphe de Bacchus	1873	
Henri	-	le double trapèze	1875	
Isodore	-	les cordages américains	1867	
Joséphine	Colombine	le coffre magique	1860	
Kaufmann	d'Arlequin	le coffre magique	1860	
M.L.	-	le tonneau magique	1875	
Laurence	-	la rencontre de larfaillou & claudine	1875	
Francis de Madrid	-	la barre fixe	1875	
Saïd Mahomet	Le Petit sans Pareil	le moulinet du fusil arabe le saut des poinarts	1873 1877	
Mustapha	le Samson du Désert L'Hercule du désert l’Hercule de l’Atlas	les colonnes du temple Jérusalem les pyramides humaines	1853 1867 1869 1873 1874 1875 1877 1883	
Bastien-Frise-Poulet	-	grande pantomime	1875	
Eugene Saïd	-	les deux gladiateurs	1873	
Waring	-	l'homme serpent	1883	

== Reception ==
In 1867, La Normandie describes the Troupe des Cinq-Nations arriving at the Saint-Tourin fair. It says they established their encampment in the Bel-Ébat meadow and have a great reputation for strength and agility. Three days later a review follows. It states they performed for a full house and immediately won the favour of the public, justified by the variety of its programme and the many elements contributing to its success. Highlights mentioned are the human pyramids and Mustapha, "whose powerful physique recalls that of his compatriot Atlas carrying the heavens upon his shoulders". Other highlights contain the balancing and bracopedestrian exercises of Francis and Bracco junior, the American ropes performed by Isidore, and the repertoire of pantomimes drawn from the entertaining traditions of the illustrious Debureau.

In 1869 the Grande Loge des Cinq Nations Réunies made its debut in the immense Béthune theatre. The performances were according to the review as varied as they were brilliant, executed by a large number of performers with remarkable skill, and earned well-deserved applause. Highlighted are Mr. Louis on "la mappemonde" and "la colonne du Temple de Jérusalem", where Mustapha stacked ten persons on his shoulders. The review concludes with: "We wish Mr. Bracco, the intelligent director, excellent receipts. Lovers of good entertainment will wish to attend the performances of this fine troupe".

A newspaper report from 1873 noted that the public showed particular enthusiasm for the Troupe des Arabes of Bracco and Mustapha, with the crowd flocking in large numbers every evening. The review praised the daring fantasias of the Arab, Touareg and Kabyle performers and highlighted the company's varied programme of acrobatics, comic interludes and pantomimes featuring a highly acclaimed Pierrot.

An announcement from February 1877 states the Troupe des Arabes will return to the venue Théâtre de Troyes with a new and varied show, and being fondly remembered by the public. It says "the most astonishing feats and the most remarkable displays of skill are mere playthings for these first-rate equestrians, balance artists, and gymnasts". Highlights mentioned are Saïd Mahomet 'le saut de poignards and Mustapha's carrying of the troupe. The author mentions he visited the performers of the Céleste-Empire and wonders if the troupe might surpass them.

A contemporary review from march 1877 praised the Grande Troupe Arabe's acrobatic leaps, strength and agility, presenting its performers as archetypal men of the desert and emphasizing their North African image.

In april 1877 a journalist visits the fair where La Troupe Arabe is playing and describes in detail what he experienced. Mustapha is singled out as the revered leader. He then wonders why the stage manager of the troupe is dressed as a Breton peasant and not Kabyle or Touareg. The described astonishing Breton is asking the honourable audience to applaud the Arab troupe enthusiastically and to cry "Bravo!" after every act. The author writes he implores the spectators not to be stingy with their applause, for the Arab performers become inspired by the stamping and cheering of the crowd and repay its admiration with extraordinary feats. He then goes on to mark Saïd Mohamet's act as the most notable one. He also mentions the Kabyle performers then beginning an impressive series of somersaults—forward, backward, to the left and to the right. They are all described as astonishingly supple, and admires their agility and strength. Shortly memtioned are the Italian performers. The show concluded with Mustapha, carrying nine performers on his shoulders, and is described parading across the stage with the ease of a gentleman taking a stroll.

In 1883, Le Lez describes the success of the Troupe Arabe as continuing unabated.

A contemporary press report in Le L'Avenir du Tarn from 1884 noted the growing success of the Théâtre Arabe under Bracco and Mustapha and describes how the astonishing performances of these foreign artists are greatly admired by connoisseurs.
