= Saïd Ben Mohamed =

Algerian-born French performer (1827-1890) and Édith Piaf's great-grandfather

- Born: 1827; Constantine, Algeria
- Died: 4 December 1890 (aged 62–63); Hôtel de Ville, Montluçon, France
- Other names: Saïd Mahomet le Petit sans Pareil
- Occupation: Performer
- Spouse: Margherita (alternatively Marguerite) Bracco (m. 1853)
- Children: Emma Saïd Ben Mohamed
- Relatives: Line Marsa (granddaughter); Édith Piaf (great-granddaughter)

Saïd Ben Mohamed (born 1827), also known as Saïd Mahomet or by his stage name le Petit sans Pareil, was a performer from Constantine, Algeria who performed in France from the 1850s. He was the maternal great-grandfather of Edith Piaf.

== Biography ==
Saïd Ben Mohamed, an Algerian Kabyle acrobat, was born in 1827 in Constantine, Algeria. Other sources state he was born in Mogador, now known as Essaouira. His father was Mohamed Ben Mohamed and his mother Ajoh Ben Ali (alternatively Ajose Beau Arsé and Ajoh Bent).

== Career ==
Saïd presumably arrived in Paris in 1850. On 29 June, the Cirque des Champs-Elysées presented an "extraordinary troupe of nine Kabyle acrobats who arrived in Paris just a few days ago." The acrobats were often described in posters and newspapers as being Arab, Tuareg, or Kabyle, while they were often Moroccan artists who performed human pyramid or aerial acts on the stages of European circuses.

Saïd and Mustapha Amar (Ben-Bel-Aïd), both part of the troupe performing in Paris, were hired by Italian circus director Joseph Bracco (his future father in law). Bracco and Mustapha became the directors of the troupe.

They named their troupe Grande loge de la troupe des Cinq-Nations, alternatively Troupe des Arabes, Grande Troupe Arabe, and Théâtre Arabe. They used to often carry the subtitle du Mont Atlas and later Les Merveilles du Desert.

Saïd's stage name, "le Petit sans Pareil", literally means "the little incomparable one". He is described as such on the advertising poster, as well as in the newspapers.

His act consisted of "le moulinet du fusil arabe", meaning the lightning-fast spinning of an Arab rifle. A contemporary review of the Troupe des Arabes at the Foire du Trône (1877) singled out Saïd's rifle-manipulation act as "the most remarkable part of the performance", describing him as performing "a thousand feats of dexterity" with an Arab rifle while the troupe answered his cries in chorus.

Another part of his act was "le saut des poignards", a daggerleap, which is an acrobatic act in which daggers are on the ground and the acrobat jumps over or between them.

== Personal life ==
On 5 December 1852, Saïd Ben Mohamed and Margherita Bracco (alternatively Marguerite Brague) registered their intention to marry in Poitiers. Their child was born on the following day, 6 December 1852.

Saïd and Margherita were married on 4 February 1853 in Poitiers. Margherita Bracco, also an acrobat, was born on 30 August 1830 in Murazzano, Italy to Joseph Bracco and Catherine Chapelle. Two of Margherita's sisters, Anna and Maria Elisabetta, also married circus performers. Maria Elisabetta married the previously mentioned Mustapha on the same day that Saïd married Margherita.

== Descendants ==
The last mentions of the troupe found in the press date from 1885.

Marguerite and Saïd had many children and continued their careers as acrobats.

In 1876 they had a child named Emma Saïd Ben Mohamed. She grew up to be a performer. In 1892 Emma Saïd was described as performing at the Théâtre Saïd, a travelling family entertainment company directed by Eugène Saïd. Théâtre Saïd is described as formerly known as Théâtre Bracco-Moustapha, establishing a direct link to Grande loge de la troupe des Cinq-Nations from directors Bracco and Mustapha. This is the troupe troupe in which Saïd Ben Mohamed worked as a performer.

In 1895, Emma's daughter Annetta Giovanna was born in Livorno. Annetta became a cabaret singer under the stage name of Line Marsa. In 1915, Annetta gave birth to a daughter, French singer Édith Piaf. Emma became the primary caregiver of her granddaughter Edith from 1915 to 1916.

== Death ==
Saïd died on 4 December 1890 in Hôtel de Ville, Montluçon, France.
