= Théo Sarapo =

French singer and actor (1936–1970)

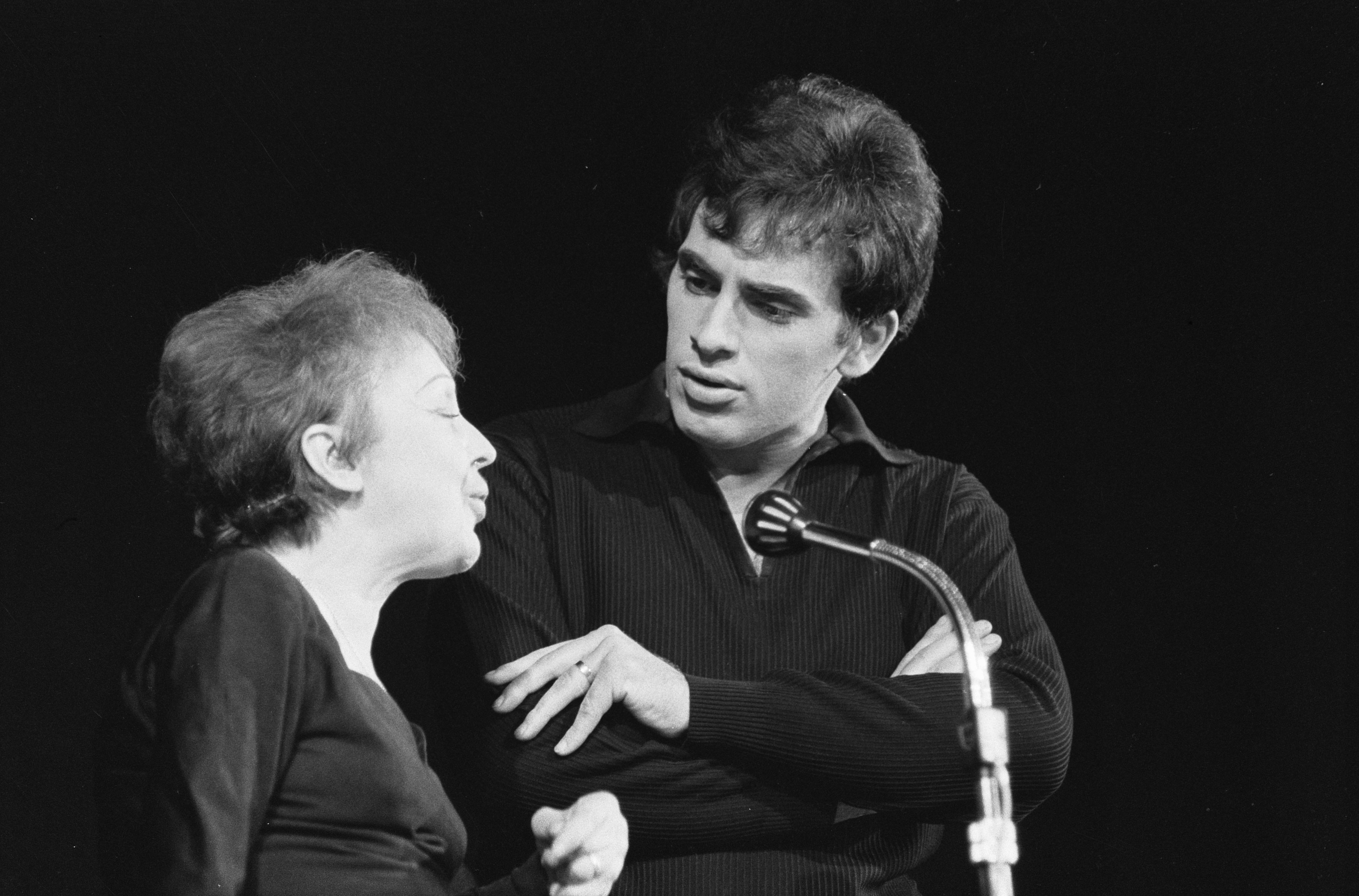
- Sarapo with his wife Édith Piaf on stage in Rotterdam, Netherlands, in 1962

Background information
- Born: Théophanis Lamboukas; 26 January 1936; Paris, France
- Died: 28 August 1970 (aged 34) Limoges, France
- Genres: Chanson
- Occupations: Singer, actor
- Years active: 1962–1970
- Spouse: Édith Piaf (m. 1962; died 1963)

Théophanis Lamboukas (Greek: Θεοφάνης Λαμπουκάς; 26 January 1936 – 28 August 1970), professionally known as Théo Sarapo (French: [teo saʁapo]), was a French singer and actor. He started his career as a hairstylist and was influenced by Édith Piaf, whom he married a year before her death in 1962, to become a singer.

== Early life and career ==
Sarapo was born in Paris to Greek parents. He scored a hit with Édith Piaf in 1962 with the song "À quoi ça sert l'amour ?" (What Good Is Love?) and solo hits with "La maison qui ne chante plus" (The House Which No Longer Sings), and "Ce jour viendra" (That Day Will Come); its English-language version, "Our Day Will Come", was notably covered by Ruby & the Romantics and others.

When he began singing with Piaf, Sarapo's voice was rather nasal, but over the next few years his tone mellowed. His other hits included "La Ronde" (The Round) and "Nous n'étions pas pareils" (We Weren't Alike).

As an actor, Sarapo's best- known film was Judex, directed by Georges Franju, which was being filmed at the time of Piaf's death.

== Relationship with Piaf ==
Sarapo was the second (and final) husband of Édith Piaf, and was twenty years her junior. Formerly a hairdresser, he was introduced to her by Claude Figus, Piaf's secretary. He married Piaf at the age of 26 in an Orthodox ceremony.

He often recorded and performed in concert with Piaf during their brief marriage, which ended with her death in 1963. His stage name Sarapo is a French approximation of the Greek for "I love you" (σ'αγαπώ, s'agapó, IPA: [saɣaˈpo]), and was chosen by Piaf herself. Sarapo was the last in a long line of Piaf discoveries (including Yves Montand, Les Compagnons de la chanson, Georges Moustaki, Charles Aznavour, etc.).

Upon Piaf's death, French law transferred her seven million francs' worth of debts directly to Sarapo. This led to his eviction on Christmas Day 1963 from the apartment they shared on Boulevard Lannes.

== Death ==
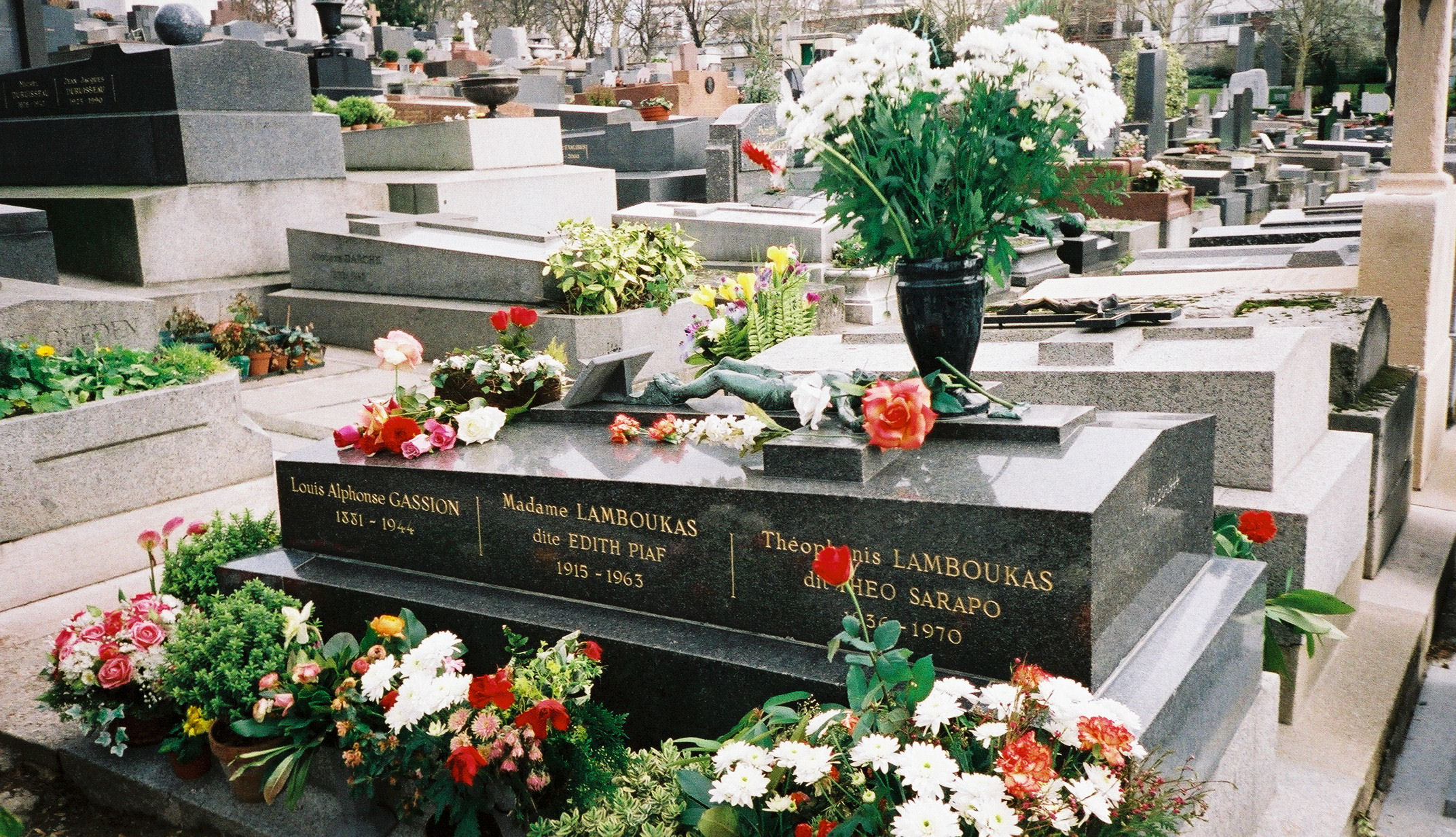
Piaf and Sarapo's tomb in 2004; his name is engraved on the side

Sarapo, who was 34 at the time, died in a hospital in Limoges, France, after a road accident on 28 August 1970 in the nearby town of Panazol on road RN 141. He is buried with Piaf and her daughter Marcelle (the child Piaf had with Louis Dupont, her onetime lover) at the Père Lachaise Cemetery in Paris. The inscription on their tomb translates as "Love Conquers All". Édith's father, Louis Alphonse Gassion, is also buried there. His name is engraved on the right side of the tombstone along with Édith's and Théo's. Daughter Marcelle's name appears on the opposite side. Etched at the foot of the tomb are the words "Famille (Family) Gassion-Piaf".
