= Emma Saïd Ben Mohamed =

French performer (1876–1930) and Édith Piaf's grandmother

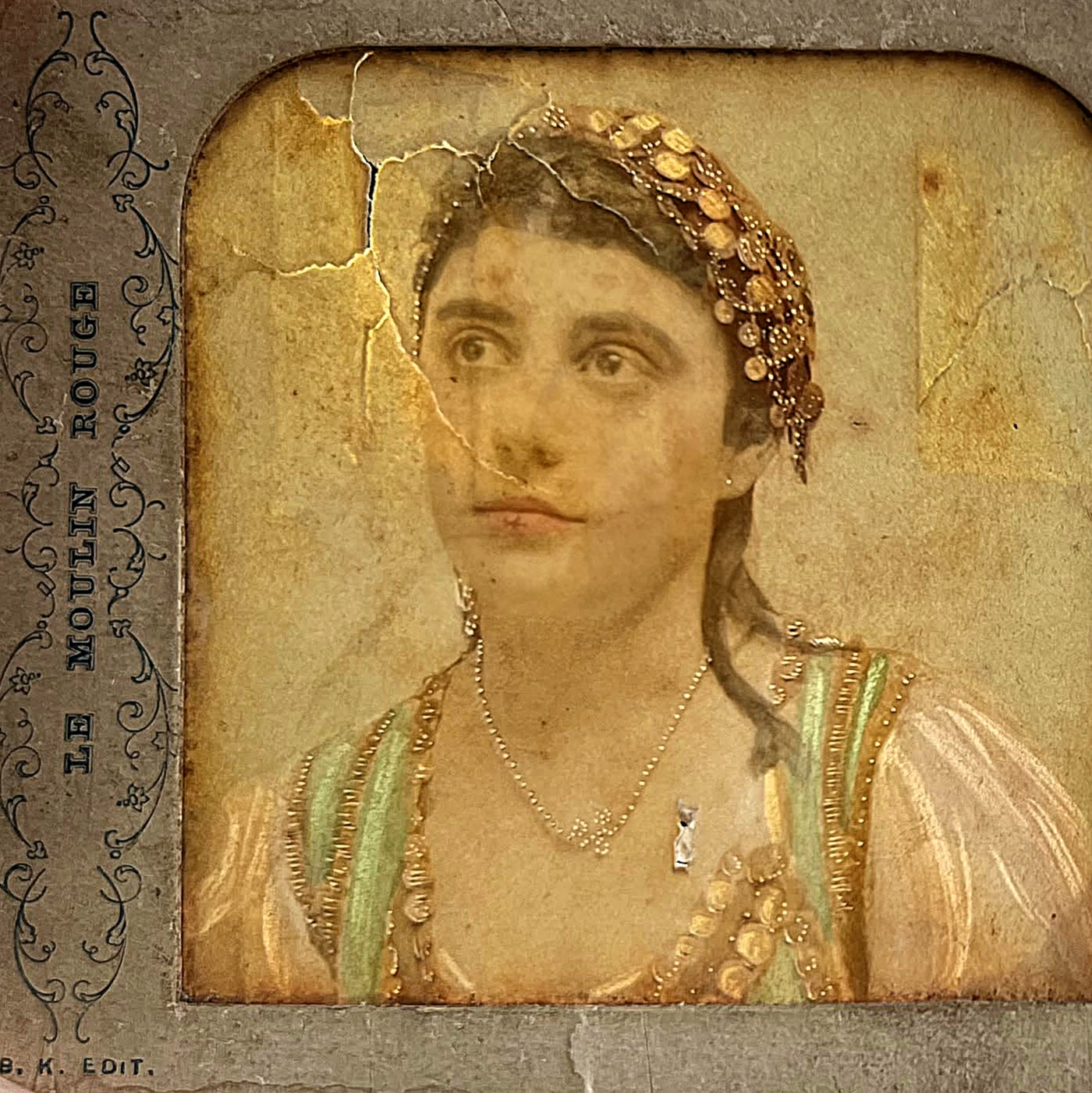
- Detail of stereoscopic promotional French tissue paper card depicting "Aïcha" (as written on the back), branded Le Moulin Rouge
- Born: 10 December 1876; Soissons, France
- Died: 18 July 1930 (aged 53); Paris, France
- Other names: Aïcha; Aicha Ben Mohamed; Miss Emma Saïd; Emma Maillard; Emma Cornu
- Occupation: Performer
- Spouses: Auguste Eugène Maillard (m. 1894; died 1912) Adolphe Cornu (m. 1923)
- Children: Line Marsa
- Parent: Saïd Ben Mohamed
- Relatives: Édith Piaf (granddaughter)

Emma Saïd Ben Mohamed (10 December 1876 – 18 July 1930), also known as Aïcha, Aicha Ben Mohamed or Miss Emma Saïd, was a French performer. She was the maternal grandmother of Edith Piaf, France's national chanteuse.

== Early life ==
Emma was born on 10 December 1876 in her parents' wagon, which was parked on the rue de la Paix in Soissons, France. Her father, Saïd Ben Mohamed, an Algerian Kabyle acrobat, was born in 1827 in Constantine, Algeria. Other sources state he was born in Mogador, now known as Essaouira, Morocco. Her mother, Margherita Bracco (alternatively Marguerite Brague), also an acrobat, was born on 30 August 1830 in Murazzano, Italy. Saïd and Margherita were married on 4 February 1853 in Poitiers.

== Life and career ==
In August 1892 Miss Emma Saïd is described as performing at the Théâtre Saïd, a travelling family entertainment company directed by Eugène Saïd. Théâtre Saïd is described as formerly known as Théâtre Bracco-Moustapha, establishing a direct link to Grande loge de la troupe des Cinq-Nations from directors Bracco and Mustapha. At this troupe, Emma' father Saïd Ben Mohamed worked as a performer.

A local newspaper praised Emma's performance at Théâtre Saïd for its “remarkable grace and dexterity”, noting that she performed juggling routines with balls, hoops and daggers. Her fysique is described as "svelte fillette", a slim young girl, and her small hands ("le petites mains") are pointed out. The troupe combined acrobatic displays, pantomime, wire-walking, comedy and musical acts, and was reported to attract large audiences throughout its engagement.

In 1894 Emma Saïd is also described performing as part of the company Théâtre Saïd. A newspaper review praised "Miss Emma Saïd" for her balancing acts ("exercices d'équilibriste"). The same review also mentioned a performer named Maillard, the surname of Emma's husband.

On 16 April 1894 in Lodève, Emma married fellow circus performer Auguste Eugène Maillard (born in 1866). Emma met Auguste while they were touring with the circus in Italy at the Theatro Estivo. There, Emma performs a flea-taming act under the stage name Aïcha.

The couple traveled extensively. On 4 August 1895, their daughter, Annetta Giovanna was born in Livorno.

In the 1910s, Emma lived at 91 rue Rébeval in the 19th arrondissement, near Belleville in Paris. Emma's husband Eugène died on June 29, 1912. Emma worked as a flea trainer and her daughter Annetta as a nougat seller or sometimes a singer.

Annetta became a cabaret singer under the stage name of Line Marsa. In 1915, Annetta gave birth to a daughter, French singer Édith Piaf. During Édith's baptism at the Church of Saint-Jean-Baptiste in Belleville in 1917, Emma was her godmother.

Emma became the primary caregiver of her granddaughter Édith from 1915 to 1916. It is around this time she is said to have stopped being a flea trainer and worked by cleaning houses.

Emma was described in 1916 as more hard-drinking than maternal and more often found at a bistro than at home or at work. Emma allegedly paid little attention to her granddaughter, leaving her to grow up in a dilapidated home where, according to legend, her bottles were filled with red wine. The little girl was allegedly not washed and grew up in an unhygienic environment. So Édith was sent to her paternal grandmother in Normandy.

Emma remarried on February 13, 1923, to Adolphe Joseph Louis Cornu (born in 1867), a hairdresser.

== Moulin Rouge ==
Contemporary and later accounts associate Aïcha with the early years of the Moulin Rouge.

=== Contemporary accounts ===
A newspaper report published on 16 November 1889 described the Moulin Rouge as a fashionable meeting place and noted that audiences crowded to watch Selika perform the belly dance ("danse du ventre") together with Mlls Zorah, Mih'ma, Ben Saïda, and Aïcha. The report constitutes one of the earliest contemporary references to Aïcha as a performer at the newly opened Moulin Rouge. It is with these performers that Aïcha would travel as part of the Concert Cosmopolite.

There is also a rare surviving stereoscopic tissue diaphanotype card published by B.K. Edit, Paris, depicting an Aïcha in oriental costume, similar to Lautrec's La Danse Mauresque. The card, branded "Le Moulin Rouge" and numbered "77 Aïcha" is believed to date from the 1890s.

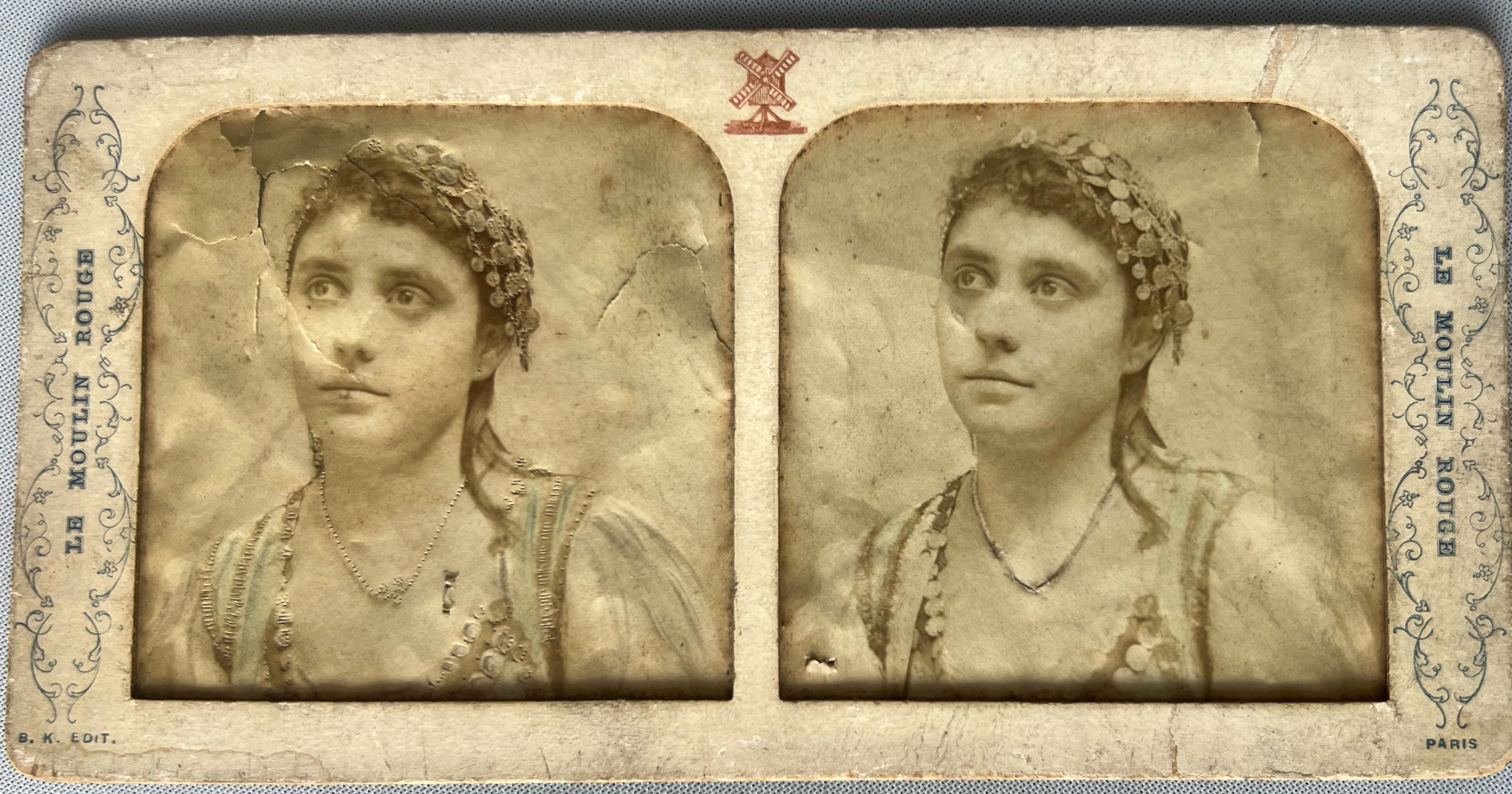
Stereoscopic promotional French tissue paper card depicting "Aïcha" (as written on the back), branded Le Moulin Rouge

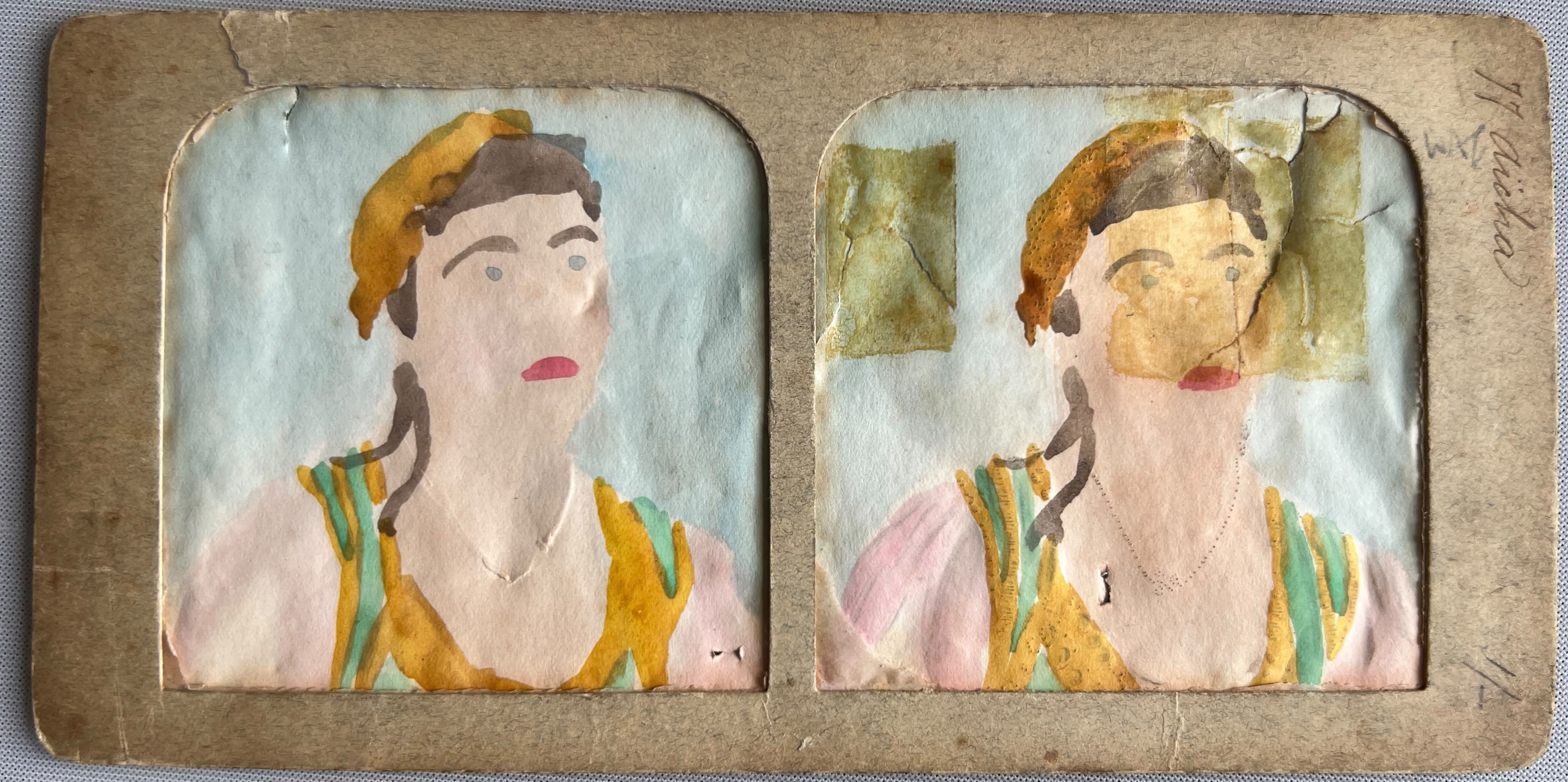
Back of stereoscopic promotional French tissue paper card depicting "Aïcha" (as written), branded Le Moulin Rouge

=== Concert Cosmopolite ===
4 February 1892, Aïcha was performing in "Concert cosmopolite", a touring entertainment that sought to present what contemporary publicity described as the “principaux types de races exotiques” (“principal types of exotic peoples”) to provincial audiences. Léon Bessas, the "directeur", explicitly linked the show's appeal to the immense success of similar exotic displays at the 1889 Paris Exposition, presenting the performers as “celebrities" in a carefully assembled programme. At a fair in Sézanne, Aïcha was advertised as “Aïcha, danse des Almées,” alongside Mlle Zora (danse Kabile), Mima-Ben Saïd (danse du BerBer), Sidi-Mustapha (danse du Pilou-Pilou) and Sidi-Ben-Kadour (danse Mauresque), with dances and songs accompanied by M. Adbella, described as an Arab pianist.

At February 17, 1892, Aïcha also performed at the "concert cosmopolite", as part of an oriental-themed show. A contemporary newspaper identified her, alongside performers named Zora and Mima, as one of three “sultanas” in the production. Sidi-Ben-Kadour, described as a black gentleman is the sultan of the show. Their performance is described as an enchantment of "Mille et une nuits", translated one thousand and one nights. The programme included Moorish and Kabyle songs, described as "made up of onomatopoeias, sometimes shrill and convulsive, sometimes soft and gentle like the sound of the zephyr caressing the roses of a flowerbed". The programme also featured dance, including a belly dance ("danse du ventre") that the newspaper associated with the popular Paris “Rue du Caire” attraction at the 1889 Paris Exposition ("L'Exposition universelle"). The report described the three performers as 15 or 16 years old.

Another contemporary newspaper report from Vitry-le-François, 24 February 1892, describes Aïcha also as part of the "Concert Cosmopolite" performers that included Zora, Mima and Sidi Ben Kaddour. The article describes the travelling troupe preparing to leave Vitry-le-François. Their performances are described as "danse du ventre" and Oriental-themed performances featuring veils, lace, pearl necklaces and tambourines.

A programme advertisement published in March and April 1892 also lists Aïcha among the performers at the "Concert Cosmopolite". The programme features several performers whose names closely resemble those mentioned in the 1889 and 1892 newspaper reports. Aïcha is described as performing the "danse des Almées", while fellow performers included Mlls Zora (danse Kabyle), Mima Ben-Saïd (danse du Berber), and Sidi Mustapha and Sidi Ben Kadour (danse Mauresque and Pilou-Pilou).

In May 1893, Aïcha was performing with the "Concert cosmopolite" at the Fête Saint-Spire. A contemporary account described her as “l’élégante Aïcha” and listed her among the performers, alongside “la coquette Zora,” “la gracieuse Mima Ben-Saïd,” Sidi Mustapha, “Mlle Blanche, romancière,” and “le magnifique noir Sidi-Ben-Kadour.” The programme included the danse des Almées, danse du Berber, danse du Sabbat and, as its “suprême attraction,” the danse du ventre. The production was presented as evoking the famous "Rue du Caire" attraction at the 1889 Paris Exposition.

These sources about "Concert Cosmopolite" solidify the initial performance of Aïcha together with the other performers at the Moulin Rouge.

=== Later accounts ===
In Mes Mémoires (p. 54), dancer Jane Avril described Aïcha, whom she identified as an Algerian debutante, as one of the newcomers to the Moulin Rouge troupe. Avril recalled a widely discussed fight between Aïcha and La Goulue, culminating in a late-night duel on the Pont Caulaincourt, in which spectators intervened to prevent La Goulue from being thrown from the bridge. Although Avril stated that she had not witnessed the fight herself, she wrote that it was recounted to her the following day.

In Amours 1900, a historical work part of 1900 La Bourgeoise Absolue (1961), Armand Lanoux also described Aïcha as an Algerian performer attached to Charles Zidler's Moulin Rouge troupe as an oriental dancer. Lanoux attributed the rivalry between Aïcha and La Goulue to Aïcha's mockery of Henri de Toulouse-Lautrec's portrait La Goulue au Moulin Rouge, which allegedly provoked the duel.

== Death ==
A smoker and an alcoholic, Emma died in July 1930, aged 53, of tuberculosis.

== In popular culture ==
- According to Arletty, in La Danse mauresque (1895), one of the panels from Henri de Toulouse-Lautrec's Décor de la baraque de la Goulue, Aicha Ben Mohamed is the dancer seated on the right of La Goulue.

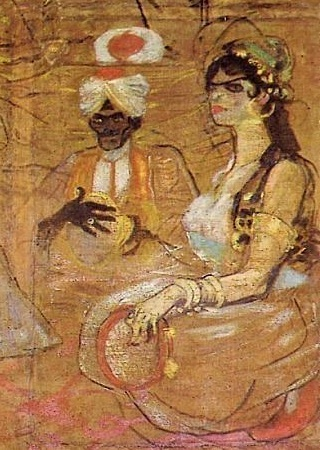
Detail of La Danse mauresque (1895), one of the panels from Henri de Toulouse-Lautrec's Décor de la baraque de la Goulue

- Pierre La Mure's historical novel Moulin Rouge (1950) includes Aïcha among the performers assembled by Charles Zidler for the opening of the Moulin Rouge, describing her as a belly dancer ("danse du ventre").
- Aïcha was portrayed by Muriel Smith in the movie Moulin Rouge (1952), a fictional account of Toulouse Lautrec. The movie is largely based on the novel by Pierre la Mure.
- Emma was portrayed by Farida Amrouche in Olivier Dahan's biopic on Édith Piaf; La vie en rose (2007).
