= Édith Piaf =

French singer (1915–1963)

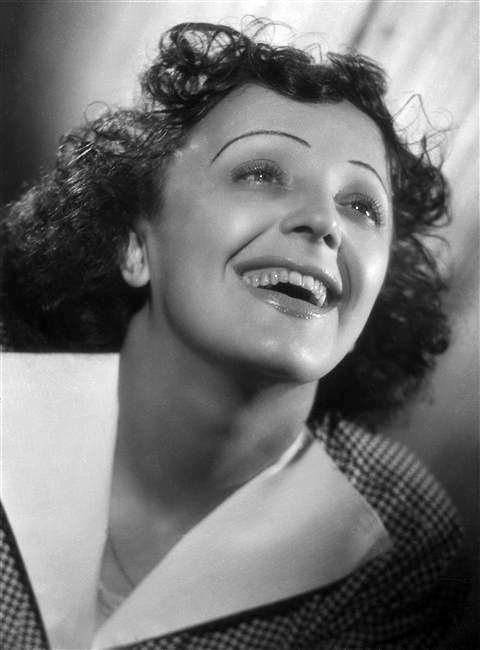
- Piaf in 1946
- Born: Édith Giovanna Gassion; 19 December 1915; Paris, France
- Died: 10 October 1963 (aged 47); Grasse, France
- Resting place: Père Lachaise Cemetery
- Other name: La Môme Piaf (French for 'The Sparrow Kid')
- Occupations: Singer; street artist
- Years active: 1929–1963
- Works: Songs recorded
- Spouses: Jacques Pills (m. 1952; div. 1957) Théo Sarapo (m. 1962)
- Children: 1
- Parents: Louis Alphonse Gassion (father); Line Marsa (mother)
- Relatives: Emma Saïd Ben Mohamed (grandmother); Saïd Ben Mohamed (great-grandfather)
- Musical career
- Genres: Cabaret; torch songs; modern chanson; musical theatre
- Labels: Pathé, Pathé-Marconi; Capitol/EMI (US and Canada); Parlophone/WEA (since 2013)

Édith Giovanna Gassion (19 December 1915 – 10 October 1963), known as Édith Piaf (French: [edit pjaf]), was a French singer and lyricist. She is regarded as France's greatest popular singer and one of the most celebrated performers in the world. She is best known for performing songs in the cabaret and modern chanson genres.

Having begun her career touring with her father at age fourteen, she was discovered in 1935 in Paris by night club owner Louis Leplée. Her fame increased during the German occupation of France, shortly after which (in 1945) she wrote the lyrics to her signature song, "La Vie en rose" ('life in pink'). She became France's most popular entertainer in the late 1940s, also touring Europe, South America and the United States, where her popularity led to eight appearances on The Ed Sullivan Show.

Piaf continued to perform, including several series of concerts at the Paris Olympia music hall, until a few months before her death in 1963 at age 47. Her last song, "L'Homme de Berlin", was recorded with her husband Théo Sarapo in April 1963. Since her death, several documentaries and films have been produced about Piaf's life as a touchstone of French culture, including the Academy Award winning La Vie en Rose in 2007.

Piaf's music was often autobiographical, and she specialized in chanson réaliste and torch ballads about love, loss and sorrow. In addition to her signature song, her most widely known songs include "Non, je ne regrette rien" (1960), "Hymne à l'amour" (1949), "Milord" (1959), "La Foule" (1957), "L'Accordéoniste" (1940), and "Padam, padam..." (1951).

== Early life ==
Édith Piaf's birth certificate indicates she was born in Paris on 19 December 1915, at the Hôpital Tenon.

Her birth name was Édith Giovanna Gassion. The name "Édith" was inspired by British nurse Edith Cavell, who was executed two months before Édith's birth for helping French soldiers escape from German captivity during World War I.

Édith's father Louis Alphonse Gassion (1881–1944) was an acrobatic street performer from Normandy with a theater background. Louis's father was Victor Alphonse Gassion (1850–1928) and his mother was Léontine Louise Descamps (1860–1937), who ran a brothel in Normandy and was known professionally as "Maman Tine". Édith's mother, Annetta Giovanna Maillard (1895–1945) was a singer and circus performer born in Italy who performed under the stage name "Line Marsa". Annetta's father was Auguste Eugène Maillard (1866–1912) of French descent and Édith's grandmother was Emma (Aïcha) Saïd Ben Mohammed (1876–1930), an acrobat of Kabyle and Italian descent. Annetta and Louis divorced on 4 June 1929.

Piaf's mother abandoned her at birth. Her father enlisted with the French Army in 1916 to fight in World War I. By the end of the war, she was in the care of his mother at a brothel in Bernay, Normandy. There, prostitutes helped look after Piaf. The bordello had two floors and seven rooms, and the prostitutes were not very numerous – "about ten poor girls", as she later described. In fact, five or six were permanent while a dozen others would join the brothel during market days and other busy days. The sub-mistress of the brothel was called "Madam Gaby" and Piaf considered her almost like family; later, she became godmother of Denise Gassion, Piaf's half-sister born in 1931.

From the age of three to seven, Piaf was allegedly blind as a result of keratitis. According to one of her biographers, she recovered her sight after her grandmother's prostitutes pooled money to accompany her on a pilgrimage honouring Saint Thérèse of Lisieux. Piaf claimed this resulted in a miraculous healing.

== Career ==
=== Early years (1929–1939) ===
At age 14, Piaf was taken by her father to join him in his acrobatic street performances all over France, where she first began to sing in public. The following year, Piaf met Simone "Mômone" Berteaut, who became a companion for most of her life. In a memoir, Berteaut later falsely represented herself as Piaf's half-sister. Together they toured the streets singing and earning money for themselves. She and Berteaut rented their own place. Piaf took a room at the Grand Hôtel de Clermont in Paris and worked with Berteaut as a street singer around Paris and its suburbs.

Piaf met a young man named Louis Dupont in 1932 and lived with him for a time; she became pregnant and gave birth to a daughter, Marcelle "Cécelle" Dupont, on 11 February 1933, when Piaf was seventeen. After Piaf's relationship with Dupont ended, Marcelle, who had been living with her father, contracted meningitis and died in July 1935, aged two.

In 1935, Piaf (then still known by her birth name of Édith Gassion) was discovered by nightclub owner Louis Leplée. Her singing when she met Leplée has been described as "Comme un moineau" ("Like a Sparrow"). Leplée persuaded Piaf to sing despite her extreme nervousness. This nervousness, and her height of only 142 centimetres (4 ft 8 in), inspired Leplée to give her the nickname La Môme Piaf, which is Paris slang for "The Sparrow Kid". Leplée taught Piaf about stage presence and told her to wear a black dress, which became her trademark apparel.

Prior to Piaf's opening night, Leplée ran an intense publicity campaign, resulting in the attendance of many celebrities. The bandleader that evening was Django Reinhardt, with his pianist, Norbert Glanzberg. Her nightclub gigs led to her first two records produced that same year, with one of them penned by Marguerite Monnot, a collaborator throughout Piaf's life and one of her favourite composers.

On 6 April 1936, Leplée was murdered. Piaf was questioned and accused as an accessory, but acquitted. Leplée had been killed by mobsters with previous ties to Piaf. A barrage of negative media attention now threatened Piaf's career. To rehabilitate her image, she recruited Raymond Asso, with whom she would become romantically involved. He changed her stage name to "Édith Piaf", barred undesirable acquaintances from seeing her, and commissioned Monnot to write songs that reflected or alluded to Piaf's previous life on the streets.

=== Second World War (1940–1944) ===
In 1940 Piaf co-starred in Jean Cocteau's one-act play Le Bel Indifférent.

Piaf's career and fame gained momentum during the German occupation of France in World War II. She began forming friendships with prominent people, such as actor and singer Maurice Chevalier and poet Jacques Bourgeat. Piaf also performed in various nightclubs and brothels, which flourished between 1940 and 1945. Various top Paris brothels, including Le Chabanais, Le Sphinx, One Two Two, La rue des Moulins, and Chez Marguerite, were reserved for German officers and collaborating Frenchmen. Piaf was invited to take part in a concert tour to Berlin, sponsored by the German officials, together with artists such as Loulou Gasté, Raymond Souplex, Viviane Romance and Albert Préjean. In 1942, she was able to afford a luxury flat in a house in the upmarket 16th arrondissement of Paris area. She lived above the L'Étoile de Kléber, a famous nightclub and bordello close to the Paris Gestapo headquarters. She was persuaded to move from there prior to the liberation.

In 1944, Piaf performed in the Moulin Rouge cabaret venue in Paris, where she worked with singer/actor Yves Montand and began an affair with him.

Piaf was accused of collaborating with the German occupying forces and in October 1944 (Note: The date of the Épuration légale is given as 1945 according to Looseley) she had to testify before an Épuration légale (post-war legal trial), as there were plans to ban her from appearing on radio transmissions. One source suggests that she was blacklisted for a period. However, her secretary Andrée Bigard, a member of the French Resistance, spoke in her favour after the Liberation. According to Bigard, she performed several times at prisoner-of-war camps in Germany and was instrumental in helping a number of prisoners escape. In particular, at the beginning of the war, Piaf had met Michel Emer, a Jewish musician famous for the song L'Accordéoniste. Piaf paid for Emer to travel into France before German occupation, where he lived in safety until the liberation. Following the trial, Piaf was quickly back performing in benefit concerts. In December 1944, she performed for the Allied forces in Marseille, alongside Montand.

=== Post-war (1945–1955) ===
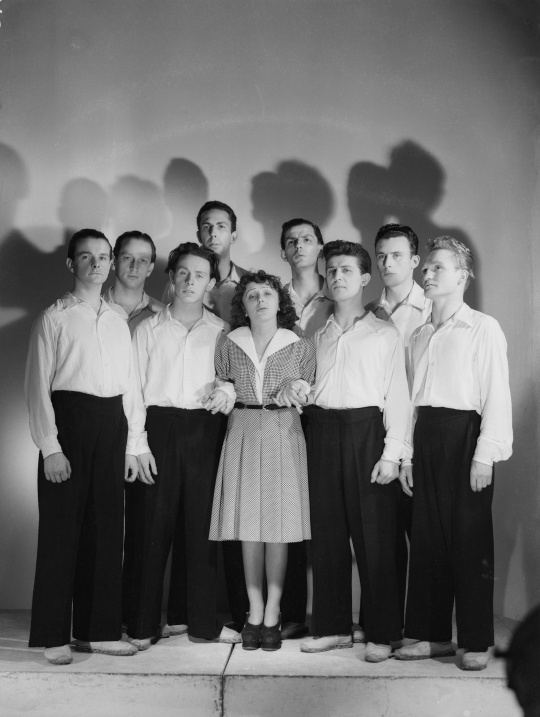
Piaf with Compagnons de la Chanson, 1946

Piaf wrote and performed her signature song, "La Vie en rose" in 1945. This song was entered into the Grammy Hall of Fame in 1998.

In 1947, she wrote the lyrics to the song "What Can I Do?". It was premiered and recorded by her former lover Montand. Within a year, Montand became one of the most famous singers in France.

During this time, she was in great demand and very successful in Paris as France's most popular entertainer. After the war, she became known internationally, touring Europe, the United States, and South America. In Paris, she gave Argentinian guitarist-singer Atahualpa Yupanqui – a central figure in the Argentine folk music tradition – the opportunity to share the scene, making his debut in July 1950. Piaf also helped launch the career of Charles Aznavour in the early 1950s, taking him on tour with her and recording some of his songs. At first she met with little success with American audiences, who expected a gaudy spectacle and were disappointed by Piaf's simple presentation. However, after a glowing review by influential New York critic Virgil Thomson in 1947, her popularity in the U.S. grew to the point where she eventually appeared on The Ed Sullivan Show eight times, and at Carnegie Hall twice (in 1956 and 1957).

=== Later years (1955–1963) ===
Between January 1955 and October 1962, Piaf performed several series of concerts at the Paris Olympia music hall. Excerpts from five of these concerts (1955, 1956, 1958, 1961, 1962) were issued on vinyl record (and later on CD), and have never been out of print. In the 1961 concerts, promised by Piaf in an effort to save the venue from bankruptcy, she first sang Non, je ne regrette rien. In early 1963, Piaf recorded her last song before her death, titled L'Homme de Berlin.

== Personal life ==
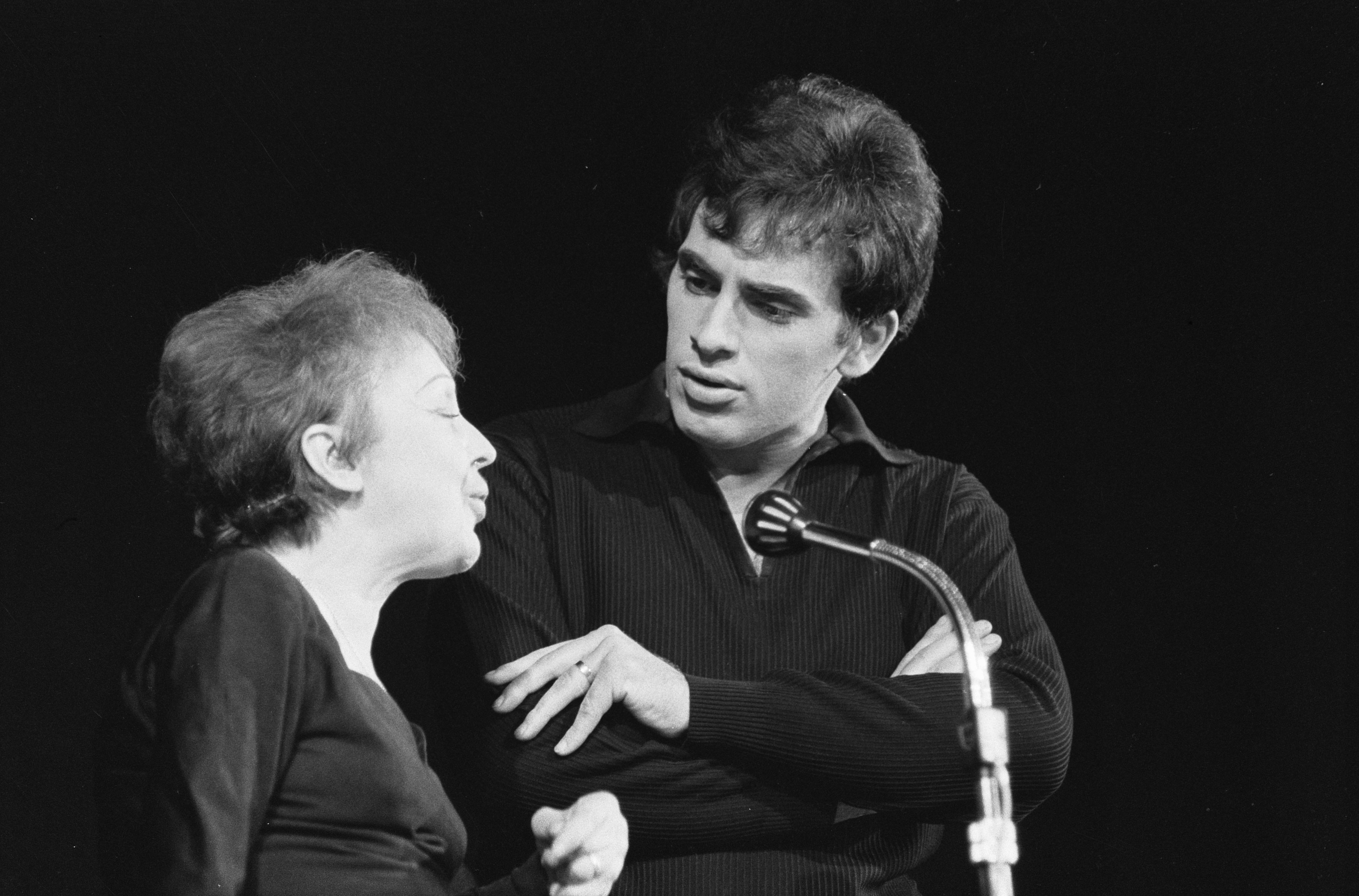
Piaf performing in Rotterdam, with her second husband Théo Sarapo, in 1962

During a tour of America in 1947, Piaf met French boxing champion Marcel Cerdan and fell in love. They had an affair, which made international headlines since Cerdan was the former middleweight world champion, and at the time was married with three children. In October 1949, Cerdan boarded a flight from Paris to New York to meet Piaf. While on approach to land at Santa Maria in the Azores for a scheduled stopover, the aircraft crashed into a mountain, killing Cerdan and the other 47 people on board. In May 1950, Piaf recorded the hit song "Hymne à l'amour" dedicating it to Cerdan.

Piaf was injured in a car accident that occurred in 1951. Both Piaf and singer Charles Aznavour (her then-assistant) were passengers in the vehicle, with Piaf suffering a broken arm and two broken ribs. Her doctor prescribed the drug morphine as a treatment for arthritis, which became a dependency alongside her alcohol problems. Two more near-fatal car crashes exacerbated the situation.

In 1952, Piaf married her first husband, singer Jacques Pills (real name René Ducos), with Marlene Dietrich performing the matron of honour duties. During their marriage, on three occasions Pills succeeded in having Piaf attend a detox clinic. Piaf and Pills divorced in 1957.

In 1962, she wed Théo Sarapo (Theophanis Lamboukas), a singer, actor, and former hairdresser who was born in France of Greek descent. Sarapo was 20 years younger than Piaf and, although later separated, the two remained married until Piaf's death.

== Death ==
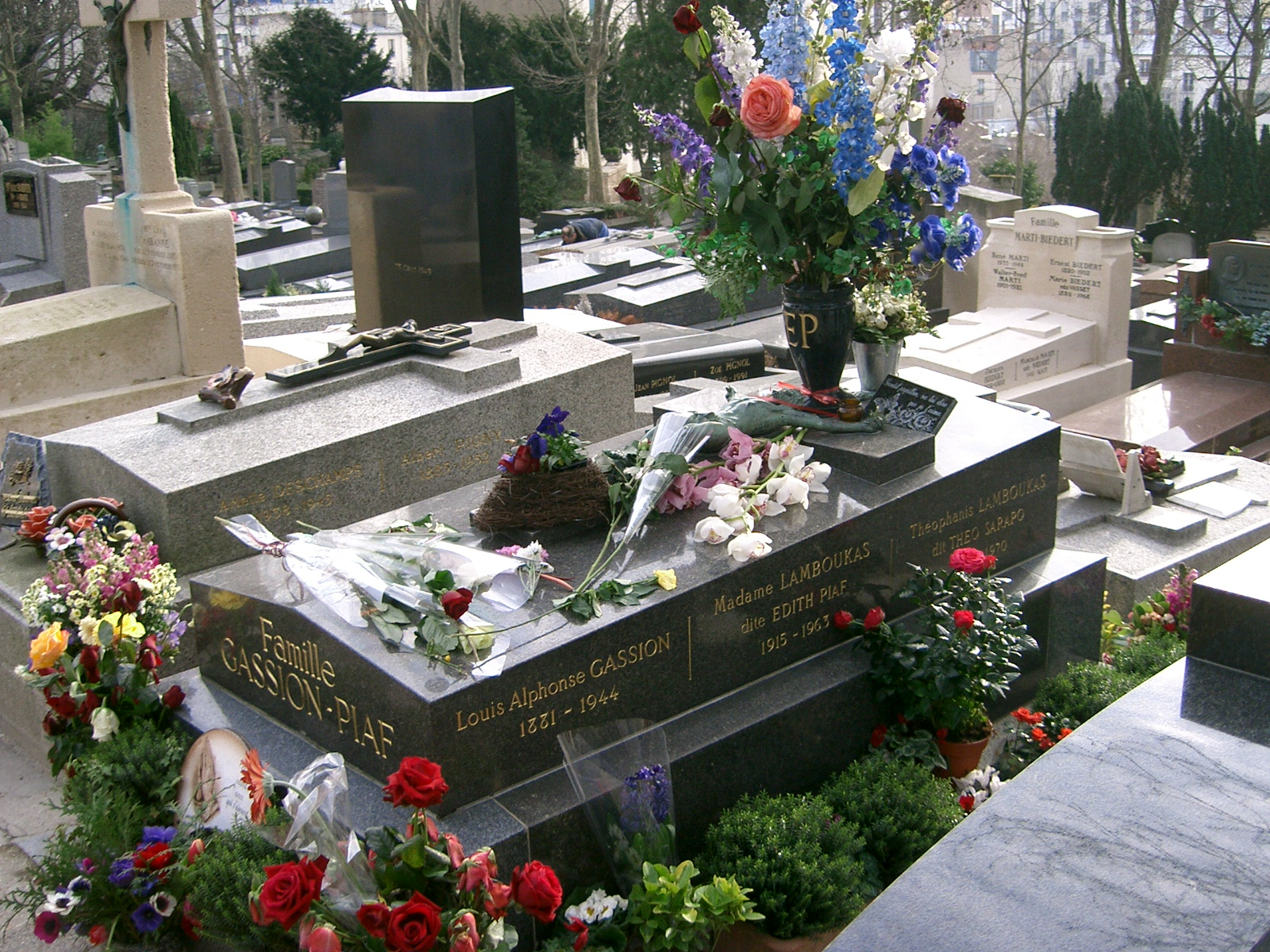
Piaf's grave in Père Lachaise Cemetery, Paris

In early 1963, soon after recording "L'Homme de Berlin" with her husband Théo Sarapo, Piaf slipped into a coma due to liver cancer. She was taken to her villa in Plascassier on the French Riviera where she was nursed by Sarapo and her friend Simone Berteaut. Over the next few months she drifted in and out of consciousness, before dying at age 47 on 10 October 1963.

Her last words were "Every damn thing you do in this life, you have to pay for." It is said that Sarapo drove her body from Plascassier to Paris secretly, so that fans would think she had died in her hometown.

Piaf is buried in Père Lachaise Cemetery in Paris, where her grave is among the most visited.

== Funeral and 2013 Requiem Mass ==
Shortly after her death, Piaf's funeral procession drew tens of thousands of mourners onto the streets of Paris, and the ceremony at the cemetery was attended by more than 100,000 fans. According to Piaf's colleague Charles Aznavour, Piaf's funeral procession was the only time since the end of World War II that the traffic in Paris had come to a complete stop.

However, at the time, Piaf had been denied a Catholic Requiem Mass by Cardinal Maurice Feltin, since she had remarried after divorce in the Orthodox Church. Fifty years later, the French Catholic Church recanted and gave Piaf a Requiem Mass in the St. Jean-Baptiste Church in Belleville, Paris (the parish into which she was born) on 10 October 2013.

== Legacy ==
French media have continually published magazines, books, plays, television specials and films about the star, often on the anniversary of her death. In 1969, her longtime friend Simone "Mômone" Berteaut published a biography titled Piaf. This biography contained the false claim that Berteaut was Piaf's half-sister. In 1967, the Association of the Friends of Édith Piaf was formed, followed by the inauguration of the Place Édith Piaf in Belleville in 1978. Soviet astronomer Lyudmila Georgievna Karachkina named a small planet, 3772 Piaf, in her honor.

A fan and author of two Piaf biographies operates the Musée Édith Piaf, a two-room museum in Paris. The museum is located in the fan's apartment and has operated since 1977.

A concert titled Piaf: A Centennial Celebration was held at The Town Hall in New York City on 19 December 2015, to commemorate the 100th anniversary of Piaf's birth. The events was hosted by Robert Osborne and produced by Daniel Nardicio and Andy Brattain. Performers included Little Annie, Gay Marshall, Amber Martin, Marilyn Maye, Meow Meow, Elaine Paige, Molly Pope, Vivian Reed, Kim David Smith, and Aaron Weinstein.

At the 2024 Olympic Summer Games opening ceremony, Canadian singer Celine Dion performed "L'Hymne à l'amour".

Piaf is best known for performing songs in the cabaret and modern chanson genres.

In 1976, Elton John and Bernie Taupin paid tribute to her in "Cage the Songbird," which was released on John's Blue Moves album and dedicated to Piaf.

=== Biographies ===
Piaf's life has been the subject of numerous films, including:

- Piaf (1974), directed by Guy Casaril, depicted her early years
- Édith et Marcel (1983), directed by Claude Lelouch, Piaf's relationship with Cerdan
- Piaf ... Her Story ... Her Songs (2003), by Raquel Bitton
- La Vie en Rose (2007), directed by Olivier Dahan, starring Marion Cotillard who won an Academy Award for Best Actress
- The Sparrow and the Birdman (2010), by Raquel Bitton
- Edith Piaf Alive (2011), by Flo Ankah
- Piaf, voz y delirio (2017), by Leonardo Padrón.
- Monsieur Aznavour (2024), by Mehdi Idir, co-starring Marie-Julie Baup as Édith Piaf

Documentaries about Piaf's life include:

- Édith Piaf: A Passionate Life (24 May 2004)
- Piaf: Her Story, Her Songs (June 2006)
- Édith Piaf: Eternal Hymn (Éternelle, l'hymne à la môme, PAL, Region 2, import, 2007) ISBN 978-83-246-0314-5
- Piaf: La Môme (2007)
- Édith Piaf: The Perfect Concert and Piaf: The Documentary (February 2009)

In 1978, a play titled Piaf (by English playwright Pam Gems) began a run of 165 performances in London and New York.

In 2023, Warner Music Group (WMG) announced a new biopic of Piaf that would be narrated by an artificial intelligence program that has been trained to replicate Piaf's voice. The project has been conducted in partnership with the Piaf estate, which supplied the recordings used in the process.

== Discography ==
In the pre-LP era Piaf recorded singles for Polydor, Columbia Graphophone and Decca.

The following titles are compilations of Piaf's songs and not reissues of the titles released while Piaf was active.

- Edith Piaf: Edith Piaf (Music For Pleasure MFP 1396) 1961
- Potpourri par Piaf (Capitol ST 10295) 1962
- Ses Plus Belles Chansons (Contour 6870505) 1969
- The Early Years: 1938–1945, Vol. 3, (DRG Records – 5565), original release date: 1989
- The Voice of the Sparrow: The Very Best of Édith Piaf (Capitol - P4 96632), original release date: June 1991
- Édith Piaf: 30e Anniversaire, (EMI France – 827 1002), original release date: 5 April 1994
- Édith Piaf: Her Greatest Recordings 1935–1943, (ASV – CD AJA 5165), original release date: 15 July 1995
- Hymn to Love: All Her Greatest Songs in English, (EMI – 07243838231 2), original release date: 4 November 1996
- The Very Best of Édith Piaf, (EMI – 8565212), released 1997
- Gold Collection, (Fine Tune – 1117-2), original release date: 9 January 1998
- The Rare Piaf 1950–1962, (DRG Records – 5570), released 28 April 1998
- La Vie en rose, ( ASV – CD AJA 5307), original release date: 26 January 1999
- Montmartre Sur Seine (soundtrack import), (The Soundtrack Factory – SFCD33544), original release date: 19 September 2000
- Love and Passion (boxed set), (Proper Records – P1237-P1240), released 2001
- Éternelle: The Best Of, (EMI – 7243 5 35553 2 0), released 29 January 2002
- 75 Chansons (Box set/import), (Disky – FMP 645202), original release date: 22 September 2005
- 48 Titres Originaux (import), (CD - Intense #224033), September 2006
- Édith Piaf: L'Intégrale/Complete 20 CD/413 Chansons, (EMI – 0946 3872182 6), original release date: 27 February 2007
- Édith Piaf: The Absolutely Essential 3 CD Collection/Proper Records UK, (Big3 – BT3043), original release date: 31 May 2011
- Édith Piaf: Symphonique (featuring Legendis Orchestra), (Warner Music France – 5054197665400), original release date: 13 October 2023

== Filmography ==
Year	Title	Director
1936	La garçonne	Jean de Limur
1940	Le Bel Indifférent (Note: A single-act play (monologue) performed at the Théâtre des Bouffes-Parisiens in Paris)	Jean Cocteau
1941	Montmartre-sur-Seine	Georges Lacombe
1946	Star Without Light	Marcel Blistène
1947	Neuf garçons, un cœur	Georges Friedland
1951	Paris Still Sings	Pierre Montazel
1953	Boum sur Paris	Maurice de Canonge
1954	Si Versailles m'était conté	Sacha Guitry
1954	French Cancan	Jean Renoir
1958	Música de Siempre (Note: In the film, Piaf performs a Spanish version of "La Vie en rose".)	Tito Davison
1959	The Lovers of Tomorrow	Marcel Blistène

== See also ==
- Music of France
- French popular music
