= Line Marsa =

French singer (1895–1945)

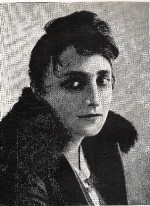
- Portrait of Line Marsa, used in an advertisement at the Petit Casino 1925.
- Born: Annetta Giovanna Maillard; 4 August 1895; Livorno, Italy
- Died: 6 February 1945 (aged 49); Paris, France
- Other names: Annetta Gassion; Annetta Giovanna Margherita Maillard
- Occupations: Cabaret singer; equestrian; tightrope artist
- Known for: Mother of Édith Piaf
- Spouse: Louis Alphonse Gassion (m. 1914; div. 1929)
- Children: 2, including Édith Piaf
- Parent(s): Auguste Eugène Maillard; Emma Saïd Ben Mohamed
- Relatives: Saïd Ben Mohamed (grandfather)

Annetta Giovanna Gassion (née Maillard; 4 August 1895 – 6 February 1945), known by stage name Line Marsa, was a French cabaret singer and circus performer, as an equestrian and tightrope artist. She is best known as the mother of internationally renowned singer Édith Piaf, considered France's national chanteuse.

== Early life ==
Born Annetta Giovanna Maillard on 4 August 1895 in Livorno, Tuscany, to French parents who were on tour as part of a travelling circus troupe. Her father, Auguste Eugène Maillard, came from the Loire region of France. Her mother, Emma, was the daughter of Saïd Ben Mohamed, an Algerian Kabyle acrobat, born in 1827 in Constantine, Algeria. Other sources state he was born in Mogador, now known as Essaouira, Morocco. Her mother Margherita (or Marguerite) Bracco, was born in Murazzano, Piedmont, Italy.

== Career ==
Line Marsa was a singer, circus performer and equestrian. She also worked as a nougat seller.

Her stage name, Line Marsa, was inspired by La Marsa, a port in Tunisia, according to her son Herbert. Although said to have a voice similar to that of Piaf, some say she had no success as a singer.

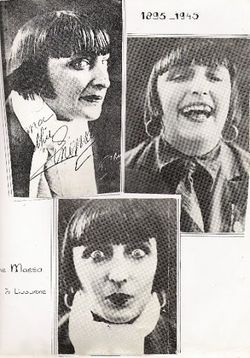
Line Marsa, likely Publicity Photos

A 1942 profile described Marsa as performing the classic cabaret repertoire in Montmartre. According to the article, she had sung in the streets like her daughter and later travelled through the provinces with a music-hall tour before establishing herself in Paris. It specifically mentioned singing engagements at the Abbaye, the Bohême and the Jockey, where she succeeded her daughter. The article also drew attention to the resemblance between mother and daughter, describing Marsa as having “almost the same” full, deep voice, with rough inflections.

“Presque la même voix pleine et grave, traversée d’inflexions rauques”

— 7 jours : grand hebdomadaire d'actualités, 29 March 1942

In 1952, Line Marsa was described as a “singer of great talent” in an article about the chansonnier Jean Marsac. Marsac had adopted his pseudonym after finding the name in a Michelin guide, unaware that it closely resembled the stage name of Edith Piaf's mother. The two subsequently met, each hoping to persuade the other to change their name. Neither did so, but the meeting resulted in a friendship: Marsa became an admirer of Marsac and reportedly rarely missed one of his performances.

A 1953 review of Edith Piaf's recital at the Théâtre Marigny described her as the daughter of “a performer of goualantes, the charming Line Marsa” ("une lanceuse de goualantes, la charmante Line Marsa"). The review associated Marsa with the popular, working-class song tradition from which Piaf's own vocal style had emerged.

=== Singer ===
Line was advertised as "chanteuse",, "chanteuse réaliste", "diseuse réaliste", "réaliste moderne", "réaliste populaire”, and "chanteuse de genre".

In December 1916, she performed at the "Eldorado Music-Hall". In 1919 and 1920, she performed at the "Casino Music-Hall". In 1920, she performed at the "Palais de Cristal". In 1923 she performed at the "Cinema Palace". In October 1924, she performed several times at the Casino with "chant. fantais". By December 1924, Marsa was being promoted as “la nouvelle vedette réaliste parisienne” (“the new Parisian realist star”) in an advertisement for an appearance at the Cabaret du Merle in Lyon.

In 1925, Marsa performed at Olympia. In March 1926, Marsa performed at the Garden Petits-Champs, where she was advertised with her “chansons réalistes". Later in the evening, she appeared with Lucile Joël in a programme of Montmartre songs: "chansons montmartroises". In July 1926, Marsa was announced as one of the vedettes of an upcoming programme at the Olympia, where she was billed as a “chanteuse réaliste". Her name is featured on several Olympia posters. A review of the Olympia's programme in July 1926 noted that the show was not devoted exclusively to dance and included singing by Line Marsa, whose performance was described as having “vigour” that was both “raucous and picturesque”.

"Line Marsa qui a de la vigueur rauque et pittoresque"

— La Presse, 18 July 1926

In August 1926, Marsa was appearing at the Théâtre Humoristique on Rue Jean Jaurès, where she was advertised as the “chanteuse réaliste Line Marsa, de l’Olympia de Paris”. She was part of a programme of “first-rate Montmartre” entertainment alongside comedians and chansonniers.

A November 1926 review of a variety programme at the Théâtre de l’Union described Marsa, a “chanteuse réaliste”, as “the star of the programme”. The reviewer praised her “pleasant, warm and well-modulated voice”, “impeccable diction”, and talent, noting that she was extremely well received by the audience.

"Line Marsa, chanteuse réaliste, est la grande vedette du programme. Voix agréable, chaude et bien timbrée, diction impeccable, la charmante artiste a beaucoup de talent et plaît infiniment."

— Les Dernières nouvelles de Strasbourg, 13 November 1926

A German review of the same performance at the Union Theatre described Marsa as a “realistic” singer who presented in a new form a Parisian genre that had been cultivated around 1910: “Eine recht realistische Sängerin ist die hübsche Line Marsa, die einen um das Jahr 1910 gepflegten Pariser Genre in neuer Form vorbringt.” The review thus associated her act with an earlier tradition of Parisian popular song while emphasizing her reinterpretation of it.

November 1927 places Marsa back at the music hall Olympia, where she performs several times. In this period, Marsa appeared at the Olympia as part of a successful Gala de la chanson. A contemporary review described the performers as the “aces” of French chanson, singling out Marsa as “la curieuse réaliste Line Marsa”. All were reported to be acclaimed by the large audiences attending the music hall.

In March 1929, Marsa was announced for a music-hall engagement as making a “sensational debut”, described as a “digne émule de Damia” (“worthy disciple of Damia”), linking her explicitly with the established chanson réaliste singer. In the same month, she was also advertised as a “chanteuse réaliste” at the reopening of the Sidi M'cid Dancing, appearing alongside performers. In April 1929, Line Marsa was advertised at the Florida in Oran as “la grande réaliste". In 1930, Marsa appeared in the programme at the Nouveautés, where she was advertised among an “avalanche of stars” alongside Suzanne Talba and Hary Carr. In June 1930, Marsa appeared in a series of music-hall performances at the Arènes de Nîmes, organised by the Nîmes section of the War Orphans’ charity, where she was advertised as “l’excellente Chanteuse Réaliste”. In September 1930, Marsa performed at the Gatte-Rochechouart, where promotional material advertised her as "de l’émotion avec Line Marsa."

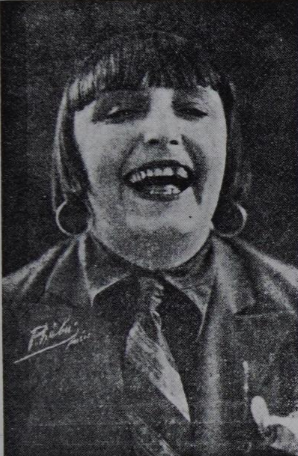
Line Marsa in 1925

In January 1931 Marsa performed at La Féria. In July 1931, Marsa participated in the reopening of the Quat’z’Arts, described in the press as an “almost historic artistic cabaret” (cabaret d’art quasiment historique). She was listed as a chanteuse. In 1932 Marsa performed at Petit Casino. In 1934 she performed at the Lulu du Montmartre.

In 1938, Marsa appeared in La Feria Espagnole, a production presented by the Paris-based troupe Arts et Spectacles at the Folies-Bergère. The programme was presented by Georges Kies of the A.B.C. and featured Marsa.

=== Troupe des Nouveautés ===
In October 1923, Marsa was a member of "la troupe des Nouveautés" in Toulouse. The troupe took part in a charity matinée for the victims of the Japanese disaster, performing the Japanese-themed sketch L'Éventail de Kesa, written specifically for the event by Michel Murray. The performance was held at the Théâtre des Nouveautés, with the proceeds donated to charity. A contemporary review praised Marsa and her fellow performers of "la troupe sédentaire du théâtre des Nouveautés" for displaying their “customary talent” and described their performance of the sketch as “magnificent”; the artists received lengthy ovations.

In November 1923, Marsa again performed with "la Troupe des Nouveautés de Toulouse" at a gala evening at the Cinéma-Théâtre. She was billed as a “diseuse réaliste”, alongside comedians and other performers from the company.

In January 1924, Marsa also performed with "la troupe des Nouveautés de Toulouse" as part of the Lange-Dorval touring production of En chair et en... Hausse, a two-act revue. She was billed as “la réaliste populaire”.

== Personal life ==
On 4 September 1914, she married Louis Alphonse Gassion, a singer and circus contortionist.

The following year in 1915, on December 19, Line Marsa gave birth to their first child. Marsa gave birth “in the middle of the street”, with two police officers acting as midwives. The birth took place at approximately 5 a.m. in front of 72 Rue de Belleville in Paris. An account gives a dramatic description of the birth: the parents had not realized that the delivery was imminent and, after going outside in panic, Marsa gave birth on the pavement while the father, Louis Gassion, ran to the nearby police station.

A 1983 account gives a detailed, dramatized reconstruction of the birth. According to the account, when a Panhard et Levassor ambulance from the nearby Tenon Hospital arrived in front of 72 Rue de Belleville, the baby had already been born. The newborn was described as a very thin girl who cried continuously. Two nurses accompanied the ambulance, while police officers who had arrived at the scene assisted the mother and child. The account then describes the arrival of Louis Gassion, who identified himself to the police as the child's father. He explained that, when he realized that his wife was about to give birth, he had run through the night to alert the hospital and obtain an ambulance. In his absence, the account says, the expectant mother had become frightened and impatient and had descended the building's spiral staircase to wait for him in the street. The police officers arrived just in time to assist with the birth before the ambulance reached the scene.

"C'est une petite fille très maigre, qui hurle sans arrêt."

— Édith Piaf 20 ans après, 1983

The child was named Édith Giovanna, who would become Édith Piaf. A newspaper describes Marsa left her daughter two months after her birth, after which Piaf's father, Louis Gassion, took care of her as best he could.

On 31 August 1918, Marsa gave birth to their second child, Herbert. Édith was raised by Annetta's mother, Emma, from 1915 to 1918, when she was sent to Louis Gassion's mother instead due to Annetta and Emma's neglect.

Line Marsa (pictured right) with daughter Édith Piaf (centre) and her husband Louis Alphonse Gassion

Annetta and Louis were divorced on 4 June 1929 reportedly because of her substance abuse. She never remarried.

In 1936, during the investigation into the murder of impresario Louis Leplée, contemporary press reports identified Marsa as Édith Gassion's mother. Leplée had recently taken an interest in Edith and helped launch her career as a singer. The report described Marsa as an “ancienne chanteuse” (“former singer”) known by the pseudonym Line Marsa, and as a “chanteuse de cabaret” (“cabaret singer”). It also reported that Marsa and her daughter had given police a version of events implicating Henri Valette, whom the article described as an Algerian-born “man of the underworld.” Interestingly another newspaper explicitly addressed that Piaf was the daughter of the singer Line Marsa, under the headline “La ‘Môme Piaf’ est-elle la fille de la chanteuse Line Marsa?” (“Is the ‘Môme Piaf’ the daughter of the singer Line Marsa?”). The article answered “Non” and instead identified Piaf's father as a modest Parisian worker. It also referred to Marsa specifically as “la chanteuse Line Marsa”, indicating that she was known publicly as a singer at the time.

== Death ==
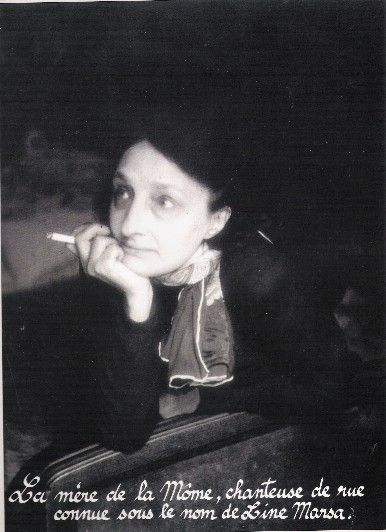
A photo of Line Marsa with the text, ”da mere de la Môme, chanteuse de rue connue sous le nom de soine Marsa.” Or in English, “Da mere de la Môme, street singer known as soine Marsa.“

Line Marsa died of a drug overdose in Paris on 6 February 1945. She is not buried with her daughter Piaf at Père Lachaise Cemetery, unlike Louis-Alphonse Gassion but in the Parisian cemetery of Thiais. Since no one had offered, after ten years, to pay for the extension, the remains of the body had been piled elsewhere.

== In popular culture ==
Marsa was portrayed by Clotilde Courau in Olivier Dahan's 2007 Piaf biopic, La vie en rose.

In 2021 the Comitato Unesco Jazz day Livorno (Unesco Jazz Day Committee of the city of Livorno, a volunteer non-profit organization founded 2012 by the musician Andrea Pellegrini) declared 4 August "Giornata degli artisti di strada" (street artists day) to remember Line Marsa. The Livornese graffiti artist Mart made a painting on the wall of the public park Villa Fabbricotti and a stone plate: "Line Marsa / (Anita Maillard) / nacque a Livorno / 4 agosto 1895".
