= Louis Alphonse Gassion =

French circus performer

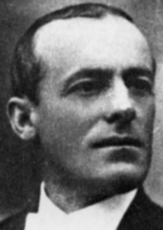
- Born: 10 May 1881; Falaise, Calvados, France
- Died: 3 March 1944 (aged 62); Paris, France
- Resting place: Cimitière du Père-Lachaise, Paris
- Occupation(s): Theatre actor, Contortionist
- Spouses: Annetta Maillard (m. 1914; div. 1929) Jeanne L'Hôte (m. 1932)
- Children: 3; including Édith

Louis Alphonse Gassion (10 May 1881 – 3 March 1944) was best-known as the father of Édith Piaf, the singer who was known as France's national chanteuse and was internationally famous. He was an entertainer, circus performer and theatre actor.

== Biography ==
Gassion was born on 10 May 1881 in Falaise, Calvados to Victor Alphonse Gassion, who was a horseman in the circus, and Louise Léontine (nee Deschamps), the madam of a brothel in Bernay, Normandy. He had seven sisters, two of whom died at a young age. He began his career in the circus with the Ciotti circus and became a contortionist. At first, he performed with family, then on his own.

On 4 September 1914, he married Annetta Giovanna Maillard, an Italian-born café singer known under the stage name of Line Marsa. On 19 December 1915, she gave birth to their first child, a daughter- Édith Giovanna, who became Édith Piaf. He left Édith in the care of his mother when she was age 2 after Annetta and her mother Emma had neglected her. They also had a second child, Herbert (1918-1997).

In 1922, Louis was going to take an engagement in the Caroli circus, but decided to become an independent act, touring with various itinerant circuses. Often, Louis had Édith sing for the crowds after he performed, which was when she first realised her talent for singing. On 4 June 1929, Louis divorced Annetta due to her substance abuse. In 1932, when Édith left to live with her boyfriend Louis Dupont and friend Simone Bertaut, he married Jeanne Georgette L'Hôte, with whom he had a third child, Dénise, born in 1931.

== Death ==
Gassion died of lung cancer on 3 March 1944 in Paris, aged 62. He is buried alongside his daughter (Piaf), son-in-law Théo Sarapo, and granddaughter (Piaf's daughter Marcelle) at Père Lachaise Cemetery.

== In popular culture ==
In 2007, Louis Gassion was portrayed by Jean-Paul Rouve in Olivier Dahan's biopic La Vie en rose.
