= La Vie en Rose (film) =

2007 French film directed by Olivier Dahan

- Theatrical release poster
- Directed by: Olivier Dahan
- Written by: Isabelle Sobelman; Olivier Dahan
- Produced by: Alain Goldman
- Starring: Marion Cotillard; Sylvie Testud; Pascal Greggory; Emmanuelle Seigner; Jean-Paul Rouve; Gérard Depardieu; Clotilde Courau; Jean-Pierre Martins; Catherine Allégret; Marc Barbé
- Cinematography: Tetsuo Nagata
- Edited by: Richard Marizy
- Music by: Christopher Gunning
- Production companies: Légende Films; TF1 International; TF1 Films Production; Songbird Pictures; Okko Productions; Scotts Atlantic; Sofica Valor 7; Canal+; TPS Star; Nydrle
- Distributed by: TFM Distribution (France); Bioscop (Czech Republic); Icon Film Distribution (United Kingdom)
- Release dates: 8 February 2007 (Berlinale); 14 February 2007 (France); 14 June 2007 (Czech Republic); 22 June 2007 (United Kingdom)
- Running time: 140 minutes
- Countries: France; Czech Republic; United Kingdom
- Languages: French; English
- Budget: $25 million
- Box office: $87.4 million

La Vie en Rose (literally Life in pink, French pronunciation: [la vi ɑ̃ ʁoz]; (Note: A literal translation of "La Vie en Rose" is "Life in Pink", a figurative reference to rose-colored glasses.) French: La Môme) (Note: La Môme refers to Piaf's nickname "La Môme Piaf" (meaning "baby sparrow, birdie, little sparrow")) is a 2007 biographical musical film about the life of French singer Édith Piaf, co-written and directed by Olivier Dahan, and starring Marion Cotillard as Piaf. The UK and US title La Vie en Rose comes from Piaf's signature song. The film is an international co-production between France, Czech Republic, and the United Kingdom. It made its world premiere at the 2007 Berlin Film Festival in the main competition.

Cotillard's performance received widespread critical acclaim and earned her several awards including the Academy Award for Best Actress – the first time an Oscar had been given for a French-language role – the BAFTA Award for Best Actress in a Leading Role, the Golden Globe Award for Best Actress – Motion Picture Musical or Comedy and the César Award for Best Actress. The film also won the Academy Award for Best Makeup and Hairstyling, the BAFTA Award for Best Makeup, BAFTA Award for Best Costume Design, BAFTA Award for Best Film Music, and four additional César Awards.

The film grossed $87.4 million worldwide on a $25 million budget and sold over seven million tickets in Europe, over five million tickets in France, and over one million tickets in the United States, becoming the highest-grossing French film of 2007.

== Plot ==
The film is structured as a largely non-linear series of key events from the life of Édith Piaf. (Note: The audience ultimately learns that the events from the film are flashbacks from within Édith's own memory as she dies.) The film begins with elements from her childhood, and at the end with the events prior to and surrounding her death, poignantly juxtaposed by a performance of her song, "Non, je ne regrette rien" (No, I do not Regret Anything).

Beginning in 1918, young Édith suffers a chaotic childhood and is eventually sent to live with her paternal-grandmother, who runs a brothel in Normandy. Édith witnesses the brutal business of prostitution. When she suffers an episode of keratitis-induced blindness, a kind-hearted sex worker named Titine tenderly cares for Édith.

Édith's World War I veteran father collects her to accompany him while he works as a circus acrobat. One night, Édith sees a vision of St Thérèse in a fire eater's flames. St Thérèse says she will always be with Édith—a belief that she carries for the rest of her life. When Édith is nine years old, her father leaves the circus and performs on the streets of Paris. During a lackluster performance, a passerby asks if Édith is part of the show. She spontaneously sings "La Marseillaise" with raw emotion, mesmerizing the street crowd.

Years later, nightclub owner Louis Leplée hires Édith to sing at his club and gives her the stage surname of Piaf, a colloquialism for sparrow that is inspired by her diminutive height of only 1.47m (4 ft 8in). However, Leplée is soon shot dead and the police suspect it is due to Édith's connections to the mafia. When she next attempts a show at a cabaret, she is jeered off the stage by a hostile crowd. Things go from bad to worse when her best friend, Mômone, is forcibly taken to a convent. Desperate, Édith turns to Raymond Asso, a songwriter and accompanist. Through harsh means, he enlivens her stage presence with hand gestures, better enunciation, and other lessons.

Édith's career progresses and she achieves fame. While performing in New York City, Édith meets Marcel Cerdan, a fellow French national and a middleweight boxer competing for the World Champion title. Despite him being married, Édith believes she is falling in love with Marcel. An affair ensues and, while it is supposedly a secret, "La Vie En Rose" is played for Marcel wherever he goes. Édith persuades Marcel to fly from Paris to join her in New York, and he wakes her up in her bedroom with a kiss. She goes to get coffee and is informed by her entourage that Marcel was killed when his plane crashed. Édith hysterically searches for his ghost.

The narrative bookends scenes from Édith's middle life with repeated vignettes. One set of memories shows Édith with short curly hair, singing on stage and collapsing. She develops arthritis, as well as a severe morphine addiction. Her husband, Jacques Pills, persuades her to enter drug rehabilitation, and she travels to California with him. A now-sober but manic Édith drives around in a convertible while joking and teasing her compatriots. She drives into a Joshua tree, but the hilarity continues as Édith gets out and pretends to hitchhike.

Years later, an aged Édith is now frail and hunched. She squabbles with her entourage about whether or not she will be able to perform at the Olympia. Charles Dumont and Michel Vaucaire offer her the composition, "Non, je ne regrette rien", which she loves and announces that she will perform it.

Prior to what turns out to be her last performance, Édith asks for the cross necklace that she always wears and her staff rush away to get it. She sits in quiet solitude and experiences memories of her past. After Édith puts on the retrieved cross and shuffles out onto the stage, more flashbacks are shown as she sings. Édith relives a sunny day on a beach while knitting. She answers an interviewer's questions, during which she repeatedly encourages others to "Love."

Édith's hard living and cancer has caused her to waste away at the age of 47. As she is tucked into bed, a subtitle reveals this is her last day alive. She is afraid and experiences a disjointed series of memories of small, yet defining moments—her mother commenting on her "wild eyes", her father giving her a doll, and thoughts of her own dead child, Marcelle. In a flashback, Édith performs "Non, je ne regrette rien" at the Olympia.

== Cast ==
- Marion Cotillard as Édith Piaf
- Sylvie Testud as Simone "Mômone" Berteaut
- Pascal Greggory as Louis Barrier
- Emmanuelle Seigner as Titine
- Jean-Paul Rouve as Louis Alphonse Gassion
- Gérard Depardieu as Louis Leplée
- Clotilde Courau as Annetta Gassion
- Jean-Pierre Martins as Marcel Cerdan
- Catherine Allégret as Louise Gassion
- Marc Barbé as Raymond Asso
- Marie-Armelle Deguy as Marguerite Monnot
- Caroline Raynaud as Ginou
- Denis Ménochet as Journalist in Orly
- Pavlína Němcová as American journalist
- Harry Hadden-Paton as Doug Davis
- Caroline Silhol as Marlene Dietrich
- Pauline Burlet as a young Édith Piaf
- Farida Amrouche as Emma Saïd Ben Mohamed
- André Penvern as Jacques Canetti

== Production ==
=== Development ===
Director Olivier Dahan came up with the idea for the film on 22 January 2004, when he was in a bookstore and found a book of photographs of French singer Édith Piaf and began to look at them. "I didn't know about her very early years and (there was) a photo that really made this first impression for me. It was a photo of her in a street when she was something like 17 years old and she really looked 'punk' (in terms of her) clothes and everything (and her) attitude. This photo was so far from the iconic image that I had (of Piaf when she was older). I just started to imagine something very quickly — what was in between that very early photo and the iconic image of her in the black dress and everything. That's the first impression (I had)", Dahan said. That same day, Dahan sent a text message proposing the project to French producer Alain Goldman, with whom he had previously worked on the film Crimson Rivers II: Angels of the Apocalypse (2004), and Goldman quickly replied saying he had accepted to work on the project. Dahan then started to buy and read every biography about Piaf for his research. Dahan said that he did not want to make a biopic or to just adapt Piaf's biography, but rather make his own version of the story.

Dahan co-wrote the screenplay with Isabelle Sobelman. The writing process lasted one year. The first draft of the script had 200 pages, and the final version that was used in the film had 140 pages.

The film is an international co-production between France, Czech Republic, and the United Kingdom. It was co-produced by Légende Films, TF1 International, TF1 Films Production, Songbird Pictures, Okko Productions, Scotts Atlantic, Sofica Valor 7, Canal+, TPS Star and Nydrle. International sales were handled by Newen Connect, a TF1 Group Company.

The French title, La Môme, refers to Piaf's nickname, "La Môme Piaf" (meaning "The Sparrow Kid" or "Little Sparrow"). The UK and US title La Vie en Rose comes from Piaf's signature song.

=== Casting ===
Marion Cotillard was chosen by Dahan to portray Édith Piaf in La Vie en Rose before he had even met her, and he wrote the script with Cotillard in mind. Dahan said she was cast because he noticed a similarity between Piaf's and Cotillard's eyes after seeing a photo of Piaf when she was 16 years old in a book. Producer Alain Goldman and casting director Olivier Carbone accepted and defended the choice, while French distributor TF1 reduced the money they gave to finance the film because they thought Cotillard was not "bankable" enough an actress. The producers originally wanted Audrey Tautou for the role, and reduced $5 million from the budget after Cotillard was cast. Dahan insisted that he would not make the film without Cotillard. Tautou's agent, Laurent Grégoire, said he had set up a meeting between Tautou and the film's producers, but when Tautou was informed of the film's premise, she responded: "Who is going to be interested in a film about Édith Piaf?", and the producers lost interest in casting her, so Grégoire suggested his other client, Marion Cotillard, for the role.

Dahan met Cotillard for the first time at the end of the writing process, and he gave Cotillard some books about Piaf because he did not want to make any rehearsal nor any reading with the actress, because he did not have time to do it, so they just started working together during the shooting.

=== Filming ===
Principal photography began on 16 January 2006 and wrapped in April 2006. Filming took place in Paris, Los Angeles and Prague.

To better resemble Piaf, Cotillard shaved back her hairline and shaved off her eyebrows, which were later penciled back in. She also spent up to five hours in the makeup chair to achieve Piaf's older look. Cotillard is a foot taller than Piaf – who was only 1,47 cm (4 ft 8in) tall – and had to contract her body in order to make herself look shorter. She also wore shortwaisted dresses and worked in bare feet while the other actors wore stacked shoes. Oversized tables and chairs designed to make Cotillard look smaller were also used on set.

Dahan wanted to shoot Cotillard in tight close-ups and ended up arguing with both the film's director of photography and the makeup artist, who did not believe that it would be possible to make Cotillard – who was 30 years old at the time – look older in close-ups. Cotillard said that Dahan pushed them to find a way.

Dahan said he did not like to make a lot of takes, so some of the film's key emotional moments were shot in only two to four takes, and most of the time they just did four takes.

=== Music ===
The score was composed by Christopher Gunning.

Cotillard performed the song "Frou-Frou" in La Vie en Rose. Recordings of Piaf were also used in the film. Three songs were entirely performed by singer Jil Aigrot: "Mon Homme" (My Man), "Les Mômes de la Cloche" (The kids of the bell), and "Les Hiboux" (Owls), as well as the third verse and chorus of "L'Accordéoniste" (The accordionist) and the first chorus of "Padam, padam...". Only parts of these last two songs were sung because they were sung while Piaf/Cotillard was fatigued and collapsed on stage. Apart from that, "La Marseillaise" is performed by child singer Cassandre Berger (lip-synched by Pauline Burlet, who plays the young Édith in the film), and Mistinguett's "Mon Homme" (My Man) and "Il m'a vue nue" (He saw me naked) (sung in part by Emmanuelle Seigner) also appear.

Aigrot was chosen to perform the songs in the film after she attended a book signing at a library by Piaf's longtime secretary and confidante, Ginou Richer, at the same time that she was performing a concert entirely dedicated to Piaf. Richer asked Aigrot to sing some of Piaf's songs on the spot and was impressed by it, saying that she had never heard someone sound so much like Piaf. Richer then called Dahan and recommended Aigrot for La Vie en Rose.

== Release ==
The film was originally scheduled to be released in France on 11 October 2006.

La Vie en Rose was the opening film of the 57th Berlin International Film Festival, where it made its world premiere in the main competition on 8 February 2007. Cotillard's performance received an ovation from journalists at the festival's press conference, and a 15-minute standing ovation at the end of its screening. Hollywood talent agent Hylda Queally signed Cotillard shortly after the premiere at the festival.

The film was released theatrically in France by TFM Distribution on 13 February 2007, in Czech Republic by Bioscop on 14 June 2007, and in the United Kingdom by Icon Film Distribution on 22 June 2007.

New Line Cinema/HBO joint venture Picturehouse acquired US distribution rights to the film after Picturehouse president, Bob Berney, and the company's head of acquisitions, Sara Rose, watched a 10-minute footage of it at the 2006 Cannes Film Festival, and later released the film in US theaters on 8 June 2007.

The album with the soundtrack was released on 5 February 2007.

== Reception ==
=== Box office ===
La Vie en Rose was the highest-grossing French film of 2007. It debuted at number two at the French box office, selling over 1,5 million admissions in its first week. In theaters, the film grossed US$87,484,847 worldwide – $10,301,706 in the United States and Canada and $77,183,141 elsewhere in the world. In Francophone countries including France, Algeria, Monaco, Morocco and Tunisia, the film grossed a total of $42,651,334. It sold over 5,2 million tickets in France, becoming the sixth most-watched French film of 2007 at the French box office, and also sold a total of 7,9 million tickets in Europe, and 1,1 million tickets in the United States.

La Vie en Rose became the third-highest-grossing French-language film in the United States since 1980 (behind Amélie (2001) and Brotherhood of the Wolf (2001)).

As of 2024, La Vie en Rose is the 99th French film with the most admissions of all-time in France, and the 230th film overall.

=== Critical response ===
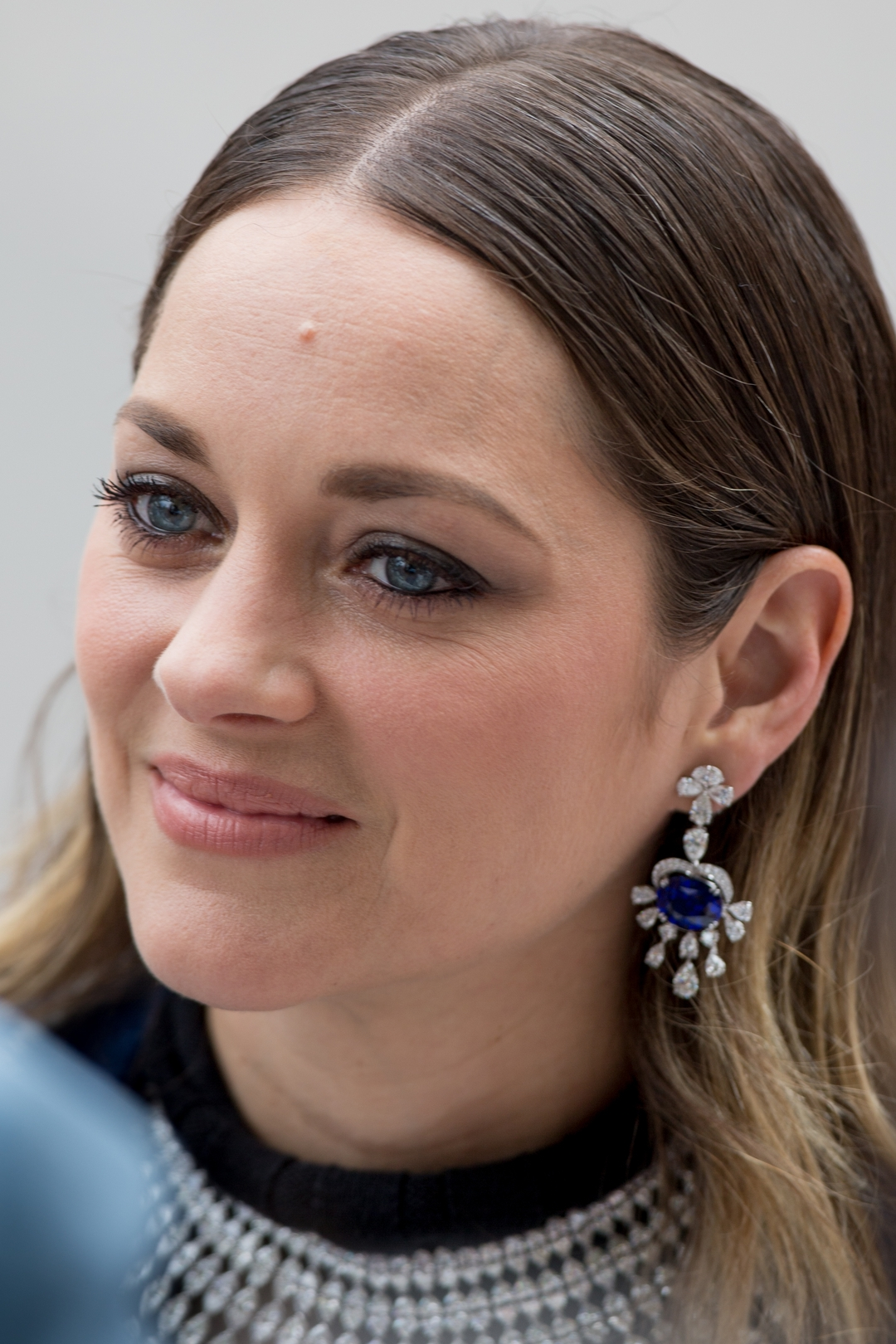
Marion Cotillard's portrayal of Édith Piaf garnered universal acclaim, earning her multiple accolades, including the Academy Award for Best Actress.

The film received positive reviews from critics. On review aggregator website Rotten Tomatoes, the film received an approval rating of 74% based on 154 reviews, with an average rating of 6.90/10. The site's critical consensus reads, "The set design and cinematography are impressive, but the real achievement of La Vie en Rose is Marion Cotillard's mesmerizing, wholly convincing performance as Edith Piaf." On Metacritic, the film has a weighted average score of 66 out of 100 based on 29 critics, indicating "generally favorable reviews". AlloCiné, a French cinema website, gave the film an average rating of 4.0/5, based on a survey of 27 French reviews.

Cotillard received widespread critical acclaim for her performance, with many critics citing it as the best performance of the year and one of the greatest acting performances of all time. A. O. Scott of The New York Times, while unimpressed with the film itself, said "it is hard not to admire Ms. Cotillard for the discipline and ferocity she brings to the role." Carino Chocano of the Los Angeles Times opined that "Marion Cotillard is astonishing as the troubled singer in a technically virtuosic and emotionally resonant performance..." Richard Nilsen from Arizona Republic was even more enthusiastic, writing "don't bother voting. Just give the Oscar to Marion Cotillard now. As the chanteuse Édith Piaf in La Vie en Rose, her acting is the most astonishing I've seen in years."

Critic Mark Kermode of The Observer was less keen; while he felt there was much to applaud, there was also "plenty to regret". (Note: A pun on Piaf's Non, je ne regrette rien (I don't regret anything).) Kermode agreed that the source material provided "heady inspiration", and that Cotillard plays everything with "kamikaze-style intensity", but thought the film lacking in structure and narrative, creating "an oddly empty experience".

Mark Swed of the Los Angeles Times wrote; "In a brief featurette on the film's DVD release, director Olivier Dahan says he recognized Piaf's eyes in the actress. Cotillard's eyes are, in fact, Cotillard's eyes. Her great acting is with them, if not necessarily through them. Dahan trains his camera on her irises and doesn't let go. But however ravishing, they are pathways to nowhere, certainly not to Piaf's soul. Instead they see the world around them, which then seems, through them, perfectly marvelous. Cotillard's onlooker's eyes, when she portrays Piaf's performances on stage, reflect the theater – the audience, the ushers, the worn velvet of the seats. Cotillard doesn't need to sing with her eyes; looking with them is enough. And listening. This is where the awe comes in. Through her own deep gaze, Cotillard uses her eyes the way Piaf used her voice."

Bob Mondello of NPR wrote about Cotillard's physical transformation; "Turning the gorgeous, willowy French actress Marion Cotillard into homely, tiny Edith Piaf must also have been a struggle. This has to be the most striking uglification of an actress since Charlize Theron in Monster. But it pays off in an entirely persuasive performance. Cotillard makes the screen Piaf coarse, tormented, hollow-eyed, and vibrant, while Olivier Dahan's color-saturated film leaps around in time in ways that are thoroughly disorienting. But sequence somehow seems less and less important as the actress lip-syncs to vintage Piaf recordings, becoming the little sparrow --idolized but unloved, addicted to morphine, and desperately ill — la vie tres tragique, en rose."

PopMatters gave it a 7 rating (out of 10). In summary it said that the film, despite its somewhat disjointed and episodic narrative, revolves around Piaf's resilience, showcasing her magnificent spirit as she navigates through love, loss, and the challenges of her extraordinary career, making it a compelling yet incomplete exploration of the legendary artist's life.

=== Legacy ===
In 2013, Cotillard's performance in La Vie en Rose was ranked No. 68 on Total Film's list of "Top 200 Performances of All Time".

In 2024, Cotillard's performance was ranked No. 15 on Rolling Stone's list of "Best Actress Oscar-Winners of the 21st Century".

=== Accolades ===
Award	Category	Recipients	Result	Ref(s)
Academy Awards	Best Actress	Marion Cotillard	Won	
Academy Awards	Best Costume Design	Marit Allen	Nominated	
Academy Awards	Best Makeup	Didier Lavergne and Jan Archibald	Won	
Berlin International Film Festival	Golden Bear	Olivier Dahan	Nominated	
British Academy Film Awards	Best Actress in a Leading Role	Marion Cotillard	Won	
British Academy Film Awards	Best Costume Design	Marit Allen	Won	
British Academy Film Awards	Best Makeup and Hair	Jan Archibald and Didier Lavergne	Won	
British Academy Film Awards	Best Original Music	Christopher Gunning	Won	
British Academy Film Awards	Best Production Design	Olivier Raoux and Stanislas Reydellet	Nominated	
British Academy Film Awards	Best Sound	Laurent Zeilig, Pascal Villard, Jean-Paul Hurier and Marc Doisne	Nominated	
British Academy Film Awards	Best Film Not in the English Language	Alain Goldman and Olivier Dahan	Nominated	
César Awards	Best Film	La Vie en Rose	Nominated	
César Awards	Best Director	Olivier Dahan	Nominated	
César Awards	Best Actress	Marion Cotillard	Won	
César Awards	Best Supporting Actor	Pascal Greggory	Nominated	
César Awards	Best Supporting Actress	Sylvie Testud	Nominated	
César Awards	Best Original Screenplay	Olivier Dahan	Nominated	
César Awards	Best Cinematography	Tetsuo Nagata	Won	
César Awards	Best Costume Design	Marit Allen	Won	
César Awards	Best Editing	Richard Marizy and Yves Beloniak	Nominated	
César Awards	Best Production Design	Olivier Raoux	Won	
César Awards	Best Sound	Laurent Zeilig, Pascal Villard, Jean-Paul Hurier and Marc Doisne	Won	
Golden Globe Awards	Best Actress – Motion Picture Comedy or Musical	Marion Cotillard	Won	
Lumière Awards	Best Film	La Vie en Rose	Nominated	
Lumière Awards	Best Director	Olivier Dahan	Nominated	
Lumière Awards	Best Actress	Marion Cotillard	Won	
Screen Actors Guild Awards	Outstanding Actress in a Motion Picture	Marion Cotillard	Nominated	
