= Théâtre Saïd =

19th-century French travelling theatre

- Nickname: Grand Théâtre Saïd
- Founded: c. 1880s
- Founders: Eugène Saïd
- Dissolved: c. 1920s
- Type: Travelling theatre troupe
- Headquarters: France
- Members: Emma Saïd Ben Mohamed
- Affiliations: Grande loge de la troupe des Cinq-Nations

Théâtre Saïd, alternatively Grand Théâtre Saïd, was a travelling family entertainment company formed in the 1880s in France, directed by Eugène Saïd, and featuring around 25 performers in different disciplines like acrobatics, vaudeville, drama and pantomime.

== History ==
The first known press mention of Théâtre Saïd dates from 1888. In this year Théâtre Saïd, according to a review, performed with an entirely new troupe of performers.

The name Grand Théâtre Saïd was used in June 1890 for the first time. In this year, an article described that Théâtre Saïd was formerly known as Théâtre Bracco-Moustapha, establishing a direct link to Grande loge de la troupe des Cinq-Nations from directors Bracco and Mustapha.

Throughout the years their repertoire shifted from acrobatics, gymnastics, trained animals and balancing to more drama, operette and vaudeville oriented. The comedic acts remained a staple. In 1897 they are advertised as "THÉÂTRE SAID : Comédie-vaudeville, opérettes".

In 1906, the Théâtre Saïd Frères was operating in Figeac. Contemporary reports indicate that the company followed a regular repertory schedule: dramas were performed on Saturdays and Sundays, while opérettes-bouffes were staged on Tuesdays and Thursdays. In 1913, it was reported they "will perform, as usual, every evening." Regarding the programme a newspaper mentions that its drama troupe was first-rate last year; the opéra-comique evenings also left good memories. A 1921 newspaper writes that following performances of operettas and opéra-comiques from its repertoire, its comedy and drama productions were also achieving what the writer described as “well-deserved success.” In 1924 in Lons-le-Saunier Théâtre Saïd performed operettas every other day.

A press notice dated 11 July 1925 placed the Théâtre Saïd at the Place Desaix, where a person identified as M. Rhein reported losing a purse containing money. This is the latest known contemporary press reference to the theatre.

=== Community activities ===
In 1893, discounted admission vouchers for Théâtre Saïd were distributed through the Union P.-L.-M., indicating that the theatre participated in local promotional arrangements during its engagements.

In May 1894, artists of the Théâtre Saïd troupe participated in a benefit concert held for the local musical society Harmonie Saint-Affricaine. The programme included the one-act vaudeville Histoire d’un Sou, Une Fête à Pékin, and the one-act pantomime L’Express, demonstrating the company's engagement with theatrical and pantomime repertoire in addition to its variety performances. The event was held in the Salle du Théâtre Saïd, indicating that the company operated its own theatre venue in Saint-Affrique at the time.

In July 1894, artists from Théâtre Saïd participated in an Alliance Française cultural evening in Mende, where they performed Histoire d'un Sou. The event illustrates the company's involvement in local cultural activities beyond its regular theatre performances.

The Théâtre Saïd also served as a venue for a local charitable event. In 1895, a performance was announced at the theatre in aid of the local charitable relief office, with musicians from the local Harmonie des Mines participating under the direction of its assistant bandmaster, M. Fabre. The theatre was located on the Quai de l'Hôtel de Ville. A subsequent report stated that the performance attracted a large crowd and raised 115 francs after expenses, which was handed over to the town's charitable relief office.

A 1896 local report mentioned the presence of the company's performers in Montceau-les-Mines. When an intoxicated man fell into a canal near the town hall, artists from the Théâtre Saïd and other bystanders responded to his cries and helped pull him from the water.

The company also participated in charitable performances in Montceau-les-Mines. In September 1896, the Théâtre Saïd gave a benefit performance for the town's poor, presenting La Grâce de Dieu, a five-act drama in eight tableaux. The "troupe du théâtre Saïd" performed with 25 artists, with the participation of a section of l'harmonie de Montceau.

In September 1920, during an engagement of nearly a month in Lavoulte-sur-Rhône, the Théâtre Saïd gave a charity performance before its departure. The programme, consisting of two comedies and several vocal interludes, accompanied by music from the local society La Lyre Voultaine, was well received. The performance attracted a full house and applause for both the performers and musicians, and raised nearly 200 francs for the local charitable relief office.

=== Structure and technique ===
In 1889, a newspaper article discussing municipal restrictions on travelling entertainments claimed that Théâtre Saïd may have been denied permission to establish itself on the Place du XIV Juillet. The report presented this only as a rumour and provided no official confirmation.

A newspaper report from January 1890 noted an accidental shooting involving a pistol kept in a wagon belonging to Théâtre Saïd. In the incident a 13-year-old boy slightly injured a companion by accidentally discharging the pistol. Fortunately, the weapon was loaded only with powder.

In 1896, the Théâtre Saïd was installed at Place Schneider in Le Creusot. A contemporary report regarding a theft refers to an annex of the theatre and a nearby booth, both of which were temporary structures; the annex contained a carpenter's workbench, a press and various tools.

In 1899, newspaper reports described the Théâtre Saïd as a travelling theatre measuring 34 metres in length and 8 metres in width. During a stay in Issoudun, it was installed on Boulevard Nicolas-Leblanc alongside other fairground attractions.

== Variety repertoire ==
=== Acrobatics ===
- Gymnasiarques

Performed by the brothers Saïd in 1888 as well as in 1893.

- Tours de force aux doubles barres

Performed by Italo the gymnast in 1892, this act contained remarkable feats on the parallel bars. A review describes that even Tartarin’s legendary muscles would pale beside those of this knight of the bars.

- Le reck américain

In 1894 this act was performed by the younger Antonio ("le jeune"). The act was also performed by the Troupe des Arabes, the predecessor of Théâtre Saïd, in 1883.

=== Balancing ===
- Le trapèze des équilibres périlleux

Described as daring and unusual balancing feats on the trapeze, performed by Eugène Saïd in 1890, by the stage name l'Homme Volant.

- Jongleuse équilibrisque

A juggling and balancing act performed by miss Fatma and miss Zara in 1888.

- Équilibres sur le fil aèrien

This act with balancing performances on the high wire was performed by miss Fatma. In 1892, she is named "Fathma" and her physical grace is praised, while performing her "marche sur un fil de fer aérien".

- Jongle

In 1892, Miss Emma Saïd described as a "slender young girl", performs juggling feats with remarkable grace and dexterity. Under the guidance of her "agile little" hands, balls, hoops, and daggers fly through the air, crossing and recrossing one another without ever falling.

- Excercices d'équilibristes

Mentioned and praised in an 1894 review are Miss Emma Saïd's balancing acts.

=== Arabian themed ===
- Jeux arabes

In 1887 this Arab acrobatic act was featured in the newspaper.

- La grande troupe arabe

In 1888 this act was the opening of the show.

- La Fantasia Arabe

In February 1890 this act was performed by mister Béhée. Alternatively named 'la Grande Fantasia Arabe', this act was performed by Moroccan performers in June 1890 and June 1894. In 1893 and 1894 this act was described as the principal attraction.

=== Animal acts ===
- Chiens, singes et cochons savants

In 1887 this act with trained dogs, monkeys and pigs was featured in the newspaper.

- Meute savante

In 1888, mister Tonino performed this act with his trained pack of animals.

=== Contortion ===
- Exercices de souplesse et contorsions

This act was performed by l'indien Milloud and mister Kaoli.

- L'homme-serpent

In 1888 and 1893 L'Indien Milloud was listed separately on the programme. An 1888 review mentioned the act as already being known to the public of Nimes, but performing with new exercises. In 1892 l'Indien Milloud was described as the prototype "homme-serpent", as if his body was made out of pure rubber. In 1893 it is described as "l'élastique-man" of London's Crystal Palace. The act was also highlighted in an 1894 review.

=== Specialty acts ===
- Les tableaux de marbre

In 1892 this living marble tableaux act contained sculptural poses and displays of physique.

== Comedic repertoire ==
=== Pantomime ===
- Pantomimes

In 1887 pantomime containing several actes was featured in the newspaper. In 1888 pantomime was also part of their programme at the Champ de Foire. According to an 1888 newspaper each performance concluded with pantomime performed by mister Joseph Saïd in the role of Pierrot, together with the entire mime troupe. His act is described as a grand spectacle in 1890. In a 1892 review, Joseph Saïd's pantomime performance as Pierrot was praised in exceptional terms. The reviewer wrote that "Joseph Saïd alone is worth a five-act melodrama and dozens of tableaux," emphasizing the expressive power of his mime and facial acting. Named "GRANDE PANTOMIME" in 1893, the act consisted of ten performers and mister Saïd as Pierrot. An 1894 review mentions Joseph Saïd as the principal performer of "la troupe de pantomime".

- Clown excentrique

This act was performed by mister Ventre-d'Osier in 1888.

- Comique en tous genres

In 1888 mister Mathieu is described as a comic performer in many genres.

- L'ESPION PRUSSIEN

In 1894 this act, translated as the Prussian spy, was advertised as a five-act patriotic pantomime.

- Une Fête à Pékin

In 1894, this pantomime act, translated "a Festival in Peking", was performed by the troupe for a benefit concert held for the local musical society Harmonie Saint-Affricaine.

- L'Express

In 1894, this act one-act pantomime created by a resident of Saint-Affrique was performed by the troupe for a benefit concert held for the local musical society Harmonie Saint-Affricaine. This act was also performed at the Alliance Française.

=== Vaudeville and bouffonne ===
- Comédie bouffonne

In 1892 the show of Théâtre Saïd opened with an entertaining curtain-raiser: either the "comédie bouffonne", or the "spirituel vaudeville".

- Spirituel vaudeville

In 1892 the show of Théâtre Saïd opened with an entertaining curtain-raiser: either the "comédie bouffonne", or the "spirituel vaudeville".

- Histoire d’un Sou

In 1894, this act one-act vaudeville was performed by the troupe for a benefit concert held for the local musical society Harmonie Saint-Affricaine.

=== Comédie ===
- Le Fils surnaturel

In 1907 this comédie was described as being performed by excellent performers.

- Tire au Flanc

In 1907 this comédie was described as being performed by excellent performers.

- Les Gaietés de l'Escadron

Mentioned in 1907.

== Theatrical repertoire ==
=== Drama ===
- La Passion

Théâtre Saïd presented the sacred drama The Passion in 1894. It is described as both artistic and religious, an of a highly moral character.

It depicts the 15 Stations of the Cross ("15 stations du Chemin de la Croix"), and each scene is described so well rendered that throughout the performance the audience remains fully absorbed. The emotion is described so great that the silence is broken only by the enthusiastic applause of those attending. In this production the artists are said to reach perfection. Between six and twelve performers appeared in each act. Highlights are the tableaux of the divine drama, Christ's final breath and his descent from the Cross. The actor portraying Christ got special mention.

It is described as achieving the most lively and resounding success.

- La Grâce de Dieu

This five-act drama was presented in eight tableaux at a charitable event in 1896. The troupe performed with 25 artists, with the participation of a section of l'harmonie de Montceau.

- Don César de Bazan

In 1897 Théâtre Saïd staged this drama written by Dumanoir and Dennery. Mentioned is that Mr. Saïd will give his final performance.

- Le Régiment

Mentioned in an 1897, 1899 and 1904 newspaper, this well received drama written by Jules Mary contained several performers.

Madame Henriot played the role of Madame de Cheverny. She is described portraying with grace a tender, devoted and obedient wife. Earning her rounds of applause from the audience. Mister Henriot, in the role of Cheverny, embodied an officer bound by military regulations who, upon returning home, delights in being surrounded by the family he adores. He was likewise warmly applauded. Mister Angeli and Legat allegedly also performed their roles very well, as did mister J. Saïd as a corporal and mister Fiquet as the traitor. The newspaper goes on to mention madame T. Saïd and mister Devil and describes it was an immense success for all the performers.

- Le Forgeron de Châteaudun

Performed in 1897 and described as one of the interesting plays drawn from its highly varied repertoire.

- Martyre

Performed in 1897 and described as one of the interesting plays drawn from its highly varied repertoire.

- Durand-Durand

Also named "Durand et Durand", this act was performed multiple times in 1897. It was a drama of three acts and five tableaux. Overall it is described as one of the interesting plays drawn from its highly varied repertoire.

- La Porteuse de Pain

In 1897, the company advertised a performance of translated "The Bread Carrier", described as a popular drama in five acts and eight tableaux.

- Roman's-Revu'e

This play performed by Théâtre Saïd in 1901, was written by one of the citizens of Romans and was first performed a few months before at the theatre in Romans. For this performance, two entirely new acts had been added. Highlights mentioned are "la Ronde des Sapeurs-pompiers", "le « pas » (de danse) des agents", and "la réunion". Three sets were specially painted. One reproduced "la place de la Pavigne" very accurately. Overall it is described as an essential local play, filled with lively couplets. It offers family entertainment, while containing scenes of gaiety.

- Jeanne la Maudite

Described as a great drama performed by Théâtre Saïd in 1901.

- Les Pirates de la Savane

Described as a five-act drama performed by Théâtre Saïd in 1901.

- Les Broers

This "sensational play" was a matinee performance by the "troupe du Théâtre Saïd" in 1902.

- Misèrables

In 1902 this was an evening performance by the "troupe du Théâtre Saïd".

- Divorçons

This evening performance was played multiple times in 1903.

- Roger la Honte

This "grand drame" was performed in 1906.

- l'Abbé Constantin

In 1906 this "grande représentation" was performed.

- Le Tour du Monde d’un enfant de Paris

This "spectacular play" with five acts and ten tableaux was performed in 1907.

- Carmen

In 1925 this was performed in the evening.

- La Fille de Madame Angot

In 1925 this was performed as a matinee.

- Joséphine vendue par ses sœurs

In 1925 this was performed in the evening.

=== Operetta ===
- La Fille du charpentier

This well-known operetta by Louis Péricaud and Lucien Delormel was performed in 1894. It consisted of several roles, described are "the charming" Mrs. E. Saïd, in the role of Adeline. Also mentioned are Messrs. Mathieu and Maillard. Saïd is described as irresistibly comic and remarkeble for his wit and energy in the role of Bidard, the carpenter's workman.

== Musical repertoire ==
Part of the company were dedicated musicians. In 1891 Eugène Anthonissen, is mentioned as a former musician of the Théâtre Saïd.

In 1892 a newspaper mentions that lovers of light-hearted songs and café-concert entertainment by the famous singer Paulus, may delight every evening in charming musical numbers at Théâtre Saïd.

In 1893 the orchestra of Théâtre Saïd is under the direction of mister Maëstro-Moro, as well as in 1894 where he is named mister Moreau.

A 1901 account in La Mayenne noted that an orchestra was playing before the curtain rose at a performance of the Théâtre Saïd, confirming that the company employed live musical accompaniment.

== Performers ==
Contemporary advertisements, newspaper reports and programmes describe the theatre as a company of approximately 25 performers, including acrobats, pantomime and drama actors. The following performers are documented.

Performer	Stagename	Repertoire	Years	Source(s)
Angeli	-	le règiment	1899	
Eugène Anthonissen	-	musicien	1891	
Antonio, le jeune	-	le reck américain	1894	
Béhée	-	la fantasia arabe	1890	
Deville Devil	-	le règiment	1897 1899	
Fatma Fathma	-	jongleuse équilibriste équilibres sur le fil aèrien	1888 1890 1892	
Figuet Fiquet	le personnage du traitre	le règiment	1897 1899	
Henriot	de Cheverny	le règiment	1897 1899	
Madame Henriot	Mme de Cheverny	le règiment	1899	
Italo	-	tours de force aux doubles barres	1892	
Kaoli	-	exercices de souplesse et contorsions	1890	
Legat	-	le règiment	1899	
Maëstro-Moro Moreau	-	direction l'orchestre	1893 1894 1897	
Maillard	-	la fille du charpentier	1894	
Mathieu	-	comique en tous genres la fille du charpentier	1888 1894	
L'Indien Milloud	l'élastique-man	l'homme-serpent	1888 1892 1893 1894	
Saïd, les frères	-	gymnasiarques	1888 1893 1897 1906 1907	
Saïd	Bidard	la fille du charpentier don Cèsar de Bazan	1894 1897	
E. Saïd	Adeline	la fille du charpentier	1894	
Emma Saïd		jongle excercices d'équilibristes	1892 1894	
Eugène Saïd	l'Homme Volant	directeur le trapèze des équilibres périlleux	1890 1892 1893 1894	
J. Saïd	caporal	le règiment	1899	
Joseph Saïd	Pierrot	régisseur général pantomimes grande pantomime	1888 1890 1892 1893 1894	
T. Saïd	-	le règiment	1899	
Tonino	-	meute savante	1888	
Ventre-d'Osier	-	clown excentrique	1888	
Zara		jongleuse équilibrisque	1888	

== Reception ==
An 1887 review describes the theatre performing several days at Place de la Montagne. A large crowd was in attendance at their first performance, and the crowd was reportedly highly satisfied.

In September 1888 at the Foire de la Saint-Michel, the theatre is said to draw the most public to its show. According to the review, Théâtre Saïd also performed there in 1886 and left the best memories to the town. The talent of the artists is praised and they are said to have achieved great success wherever they performed. It concludes by stating that lovers of refined entertainment will undoubtedly flock to this charming theatre, which is as graceful as it is engaging.

In October 1888 a local newspaper reported that the engagement of Théâtre Saïd had been extended beyond its scheduled closing date due to strong public demand. Contemporary reviews described the troupe as one of the most successful travelling entertainment companies then appearing at the fair and praised the quality of its performers.

During the 1889 fair in Nîmes, Théâtre Saïd was described by the local press as "one of the successes of the fair". Reviewers noted the troupe's popularity with Nîmes audiences due to an earlier establishment, praised its well-staged pantomimes, and remarked that several of its advertised "astonishing" acts were genuinely impressive.

In February 1890 multiple local newspapers reported that Théâtre Saïd continued to attract large audiences in Lodève, drawing a full house at every performance. Reviewers praised the troupe's varied programme and described its presence as a valuable attraction for the town. The closing of its engagement was met with regret.

In July 1890, a contemporary newspaper report described Théâtre Saïd as one of the principal attractions of the local fair, noting that its performances were so popular that audiences were regularly turned away due to lack of space.

During the Orval Fair at Saint-Amand in October 1890, the Grand Théâtre Saïd was described as one of the fair's principal attractions. Located on the Place Carrée, it reportedly drew large crowds each evening, and the review praised both the quality of the troupe and the performances of its theatrical productions.

In February 1891, while appearing in Roanne, Théâtre Saïd received favourable press coverage. Local newspapers reported that the troupe attracted large audiences and that spectators left "delighted with their evening," confirming the company's continuing popularity on the French fairground and travelling-theatre circuit.

In August 1891, a local newspaper reported that Théâtre Saïd was drawing large crowds and praised the quality of its performers and the organisation of the theatre.

A 1892 review in Annonay was strongly favorable towards the Théâtre Saïd. The newspaper recalled the troupe's previous “long and fruitful stay” in the town around eight years earlier and described its return as “a real stroke of good fortune” at a time when entertainment was scarce. The reviewer praised the variety of the programme as one of its principal attractions and noted that, although the performers did not necessarily come from prestigious Parisian theatres such as the Odéon or the Comédie-Française, audiences could nevertheless “laugh wholeheartedly.” The theatre was described as a “great attraction.” At the same time, the review illustrates the exoticizing language often used in nineteenth-century popular entertainment journalism. Moroccan performers were described as “red devils” with bronze complexions, frizzy hair, and “dazzling” teeth, and were further compared to “tiger-cats” and “two-legged jaguars.” The review also characterized the performance as being of “irreproachable morality,” suitable for children as well as adults, and suggested that this helped explain why the auditorium had remained full since opening night. The reviewer urged those who had not yet attended to do so before the company left Annonay.

An April 1893 review described Théâtre Saïd from mister Saïd as one of the most successful attractions of the Quasimodo Fair, noting that its large auditorium was filled every evening and that the company was preparing to continue its tour in Arles. The review says those who have not yet applauded it should hurry.

A report from Lunel in May 1893 described Théâtre Saïd's venue as highly comfortable, noted that its opening performance played to a full house, and stated that the show was greeted with unanimous applause throughout the evening.

A review published in Aurillac in 1894 described Théâtre Saïd as a "great success". The reviewer wrote that the company was already favourably known to the local public, praised the operetta troupe and orchestra, and reported that the Moroccan performers of the Grande Fantasia Arabe received "a harvest of bravos" every evening.

In July 1894, Théâtre Saïd toured with "La Passion", a large-scale religious drama depicting the Stations of the Cross. Performances attracted full houses and received highly favourable reviews. Multiple contemporary newspapers praised the production's tableaux, which employed between six and twelve performers per scene, and singled out the depictions of Christ's death and descent from the Cross for their dramatic effect. Reviewers stated that the troupe reached perfection in its presentation of "La Passion", and reported enthusiastic applause from audiences, including both sceptics and believers.

A contemporary report from October 1895 recorded an incident of disorder during a performance. Two intoxicated young men, aged 19 and 24, caused a disturbance at the Théâtre Saïd on a Sunday evening, insulting both audience members and performers. Officers on duty intervened, removed them from their box and detained them until the following morning; the two men were subsequently to face charges for drunkenness and disorderly conduct.

A 1897 newspaper column written in regional dialect referred to the Théâtre Saïd performers as the author's “old acquaintances” and noted with approval that Henriot, Deville, Figuet, Moreau and the Saïd brothers remained with the troupe. The columnist added that the public of Villefranche-sur-Saône (“the Caladois”) had clearly appreciated them during the previous season.

A review published in Vierzon in 1899 described a performance of Le Régiment as being “well received” by a large audience and reported an “immense success for all the performers.” Particular praise was given to Mme Henriot and M. Henriot in the roles of Mme and M. de Cheverny, while Angeli, Legat, J. Saïd, Fiquet, Mme T. Saïd and Devil were also commended for their performances.

During an engagement in Lodève in January 1907, a local newspaper reported that the Théâtre Saïd was continuing to attract full houses. The press praised performances of the comedies "Le Fils surnaturel" and "Tire au Flanc", and credited the Saïd brothers with maintaining a company of high-quality performers.

== Legacy ==
In 1892, the Théâtre Saïd was used as a familiar theatrical reference in a political newspaper article concerning the municipal elections. The article compared the promotion of an as-yet unpublished electoral list to a stage manager at the Théâtre Saïd praising actors and the roles they were to play before the audience had seen them perform. The writer concluded the analogy by calling for the "curtain" to be raised so that the audience could judge the performers for themselves. This contemporary reference suggests that the Théâtre Saïd was sufficiently well known in the locality to serve as a recognizable cultural analogy.

A 1930 retrospective recalling the Saint-Michel Fair around 1900 listed the Théâtre Saïd among the “prestigious names” of the fairground entertainment culture of the period, alongside travelling menageries and attractions such as Pezon, Rodembach and Bidel. The writer recalled these names nostalgically as attractions that had entertained his generation during their youth.

The Théâtre Saïd also remained part of local memories of Brioude's historic fairground culture. In a 1965 retrospective on the Postel, Chroniques du Brivadois recalled how crowds had once gathered there for performances by circuses, the Pezon menagerie and the Théâtre Saïd, among other attractions. The theatre was thus remembered as one of the attractions associated with the square's fairs and festivals.
