= Raquel Bitton =

French and Spanish language singer, actress and playwright

- Born: 15 July 1962 (age 64); Marrakesh, Morocco
- Genres: World, French
- Occupations: Singer, actress, playwright
- Years active: 1980–present
- Label: Sony
- Website: www.raquelbitton.com

Raquel Bitton born 15 July 1962, is a French and Spanish language singer, actress and playwright.

== Biography ==
In 1970, as a teenager, Bitton moved to San Francisco with her parents and brothers. She began to learn the songs from the French L'Âge d'or ('Golden Age'). Raquel Bitton is married to Gerald E Prolman married 1986. They have 2 children Julian Prolman, famed Artist and Entrepreneur, and Natalie Sabrine Prolman, Writer/Filmmaker.

Bitton's show Raquel Bitton sings Piaf - her story, her songs has been performed across North America and sold out at Carnegie Hall three times and Symphony Halls around the US and Canada.] Critic Ann Powers, writing in The New York Times, liked Bitton's low-key treatment as she "served her subject by de-emphasizing the pathos in favour of the craft", using "calm narration". Bitton "did well to concentrate on the great singer as a virtuoso rather than a heroine" as the legend was impossible to live up to, but "a bright interpreter like Ms. Bitton certainly can illuminate it", wrote Powers.

The show Piaf: Her Story, Her Songs was made into a film which won first place at the 25th Classic Telly awards, and received the Special Jury Award for most moving film experience at the Fort Lauderdale International Film Festival. It was released on DVD by Lionsgate Films.

== Plays reviewed ==
"Passion is at the core of the "Piaf" Persona, in this case there is a surrogate, she is RAQUEL BITTON," wrote Anna Kisselgoff in the New York Times. “PIAF..Her story..Her songs”, Piaf and Billie Holiday shared a poignancy in their delivery that few others have mastered; Bitton, here, is one, wrote Phil Elwood in the San Francisco Chronicle.

== Plays written ==
"PIAF..The Sparrow and the Birdman" the friendship between Jean Cocteau and Edith Piaf, commissioned by Theatreworks.

"PIAF...The Resurrection".

"Oy Vey! Jesus! (The Ladies of the Thirst Floor)".

Plays adapted in French, "Hershey Felder's "Maestro” about Leonard Bernstein". Adapted in English “Zelda” about F. Scott Fitzgerald's wife written by French playwright Sam Vansteen, Adapted in English by Raquel Bitton

== Record reviews ==
"Raquel Bitton's voice is warm and seductive and she has the full measure of Latin rhythms...Rafa Sardina, an 14-time Grammy Award winner, co-produced and engineered the album, and Rhythm of the Heart might put him up to an even dozen. Everything is exactly right, every balance perfect. The overall sound is lush, warm, and seductive, as it must be for this literature, but there is absolutely no lack of detail," says critic Rad Bennett of her latest album.

Critic L. Pierce Carson of the Napa Register wrote, "...From the beloved bolero of Osvaldo Farres, "Plus Je Vous Aime," to the pulsating bandoneon of "Tango Melodie," from the classic love song, "Tout Bleu," of French composer Henri Bourtayre to the ultimate payback song, "Il Est Trop Tard," "Rhythm of the Heart" is a gem. All sung in French, the songs are as seductive as they are stirring."

== Discography ==
- I Wish You Love (1994)
- Changes (1996)
- In a Jazzy Mood (1998) with Paul Misraki
- Raquel Bitton sings Edith Piaf (2000)
- Paris Blues (2006)
- Dream a Little Dream (2011)
- Boleros Sony (2014)
- Rhythm of the Heart Ritmo del Corazon (Sony, 2016)
- "Jardin D'hiver" Single (2020)
- C'EST MAGNIFIQUE (2023)
- Greatest Hits (2025/2026)
- Raquel Bitton GREATEST HITS 2026
