= Sweet, Soft & Lazy - The Very Best Of =

Compilation album by Viktor Lazlo
- Released: 1993
- Genre: Pop, Pop jazz
- Label: Polydor
- Producer: Lou Deprijck, Bernard Lavilliers, Khalil Chahine

Viktor Lazlo chronology
My Delicious Poisons (1991)	Sweet, Soft & Lazy - The Very Best Of (1993)	Back To Front (1996)

Sweet, Soft N' Lazy - The Very Best Of is the first official best-of album by French-Belgian singer Viktor Lazlo.

This compilation album contained songs from her previous albums She (1985), Viktor Lazlo (1987), Hot & Soul (1989) and My Delicious Poisons (1991), as well her duet hit single Das erste Mal tat's noch weh with Stefan Waggershausen, which was a big hit in Germany, Austria and Switzerland.

The only new song on this album was The Dream Is In Our Hands, which was also released as a single.

== Track listing ==
Original Edition
No.	Title	Writer(s)	origin	Length
1.	"The Dream Is In Our Hands"	D. Linx, G. Micault, N. Fiszman	new track	3:52
2.	"Sweet, Soft N' Lazy"	Cl. Bofane, G. Cadiere, Viktor Lazlo	from She	5:20
3.	"Love Insane"	Viktor Lazlo, André Manoukian	from My Delicious Poisons	3:55
4.	"Breathless"	Phil Allaert, Viktor Lazlo	from Viktor Lazlo	3:38
5.	"City Never Sleeps"	Rob Davis	from Hot & Soul	4:12
6.	"Amour puissance six"	Claude Bofane, Guy Bernard Cadiere, Serge Gainsbourg, Viktor Lazlo	from Hot & Soul	5:24
7.	"The Wizard's Call"	Ralph Benatar, Viktor Lazlo	from Viktor Lazlo	4:22
8.	"In The Midnight Sky"	Evert Verhees, Jan Walravens, Patricia Maessen	from Hot & Soul	4:34
9.	"Pearl's a Singer"	Jerry Leiber, Mike Stoller, Ralph Dino, John Anthony Sembello	from My Delicious Poisons	3:36
10.	"Teach Me To Dance"	Chris Rea, Viktor Lazlo	from My Delicious Poisons	4:04
11.	"Put The Blame On Mame"	Roberts Alan	from She	2:47
12.	"Hey Baby, Cool!" (with the Count Basie Orchestra)	David Gistelinck, Pierre Van Dormael	from Viktor Lazlo	3:33
13.	"Champagne And Wine"	Danny Delaet, Silver van Holme	from Viktor Lazlo	2:42
14.	"Long Distance"	Claude Bofane, Guy Bernard Cadiere, Joëlle Kopf, Maxime Leforestier	from Hot & Soul	4:09
15.	"Men Of A Kind"	Viktor Lazlo, Felix Kautzky	from My Delicious Poisons	4:00
16.	"Ansiedad"	José Enrique Sarabia	from Sweet, Soft N' Lazy (The Exclusive Collection)	4:06
17.	"Desir Fou"	Viktor Lazlo, David Linx	from My Delicious Poisons	3:15
18.	"Das erste Mal tat's noch weh" (duet with Stefan Waggershausen)	L. Deprijck, S. Waggershausen	from Sweet, Soft N' Lazy (The Exclusive Collection)	3:34
