= Le Fanion de la Légion =

Song performed by Édith Piaf

'Le Fanion de la Légion' (The Flag of the Legion), is a French song created in 1936 by Marie Dubas, with lyrics from Raymond Asso and music from Marguerite Monnot, and which was later taken up by Edith Piaf and became identified with her.

== The song ==
In all the above, the song's career is similar to that of the more famous "Mon légionnaire" - both being songs related to the French Foreign Legion and written by Raymond Asso, himself an ex-legionnaire (and who was Piaf's lover in the late 1930s).

However, in "Mon légionnaire" the Legion is seen from the outside - through the eyes of a woman who briefly meets one legionnaire and afterwards longs for him, and who has only a vague idea of the Legion's function and the places to which it is posted ("In some sunny country..."). In the present song, the Legion as such takes center stage.

The song tells the story of a small Legion outpost ("fortin" - "little fortress"), isolated in the Sahara ("The immense Bled"). Its garrison of thirty "gars" ("guys" or boys) comes under attack by a horde of "Salopards" ("Dirty Ones" or "Bastards") - evidently a derogatory term for Saharan tribespeople which Asso may have picked up while on actual service with the Legion. No background is given for the attack and the reasons of the "Salopards" in launching it.

The isolated Legionnaires defend their outpost most heroically, suffering staggering losses and terrible privations of hunger and thirst. By the time a column of reinforcements is finally profiled on the horizon, only three of them have survived the fierce battle: "Hungry, thirsty, half-naked, but covered with Glory." Throughout, "Le beau fanion de la légion" ("The beautiful flag of the Legion") continues to fly from the mast (no mention of the French Tricolour).

The theme is familiar from other fictional depictions of colonial wars (such as the film Zulu, based on the actual Battle of Rorke's Drift), as well as from Westerns. Though the song is set in the Sahara, Asso was likely influenced by the Battle of Camarón (1867), during the failed French attempt to prop up the regime of the Emperor Maximilian in Mexico - a major founding myth familiar to anyone who served in the Legion. At Camerone, as in Asso's song, there were only three survivors (though there, their lives were spared through their opponents' generosity).

Sung to the accompaniment of martial music of drums and trumpets, "The Flag of the Legion" can be said to glorify war in general and colonial war in particular. Though duly considered a part of the Piaf Canon and continually included in newly printed collections of her songs, it never achieved the popularity of "Mon légionnaire".

Ironically, the Foreign Legion itself did not conspicuously take up the song (as Asso may have hoped). Rather, the Legionnaires adopted as their own a different Edith Piaf song - "Non, je ne regrette rien" (I regret nothing) - whose words in themselves have nothing to do with the Legion but came to express their defiance when accused of atrocities and involvement in a failed coup d'etat during the Algerian War (see May 1958 crisis and Algiers putsch).

== See also ==
- French Foreign Legion in popular culture
- Colonial war
- Jacques Brel's song Zangra (also inspired by Dino Buzzati's The Tartar Steppe)
