= Loin de Paname =

Studio album by Viktor Lazlo
- Released: 2002
- Genre: French chanson
- Label: Polydor

Viktor Lazlo chronology
Back To Front (1996)	Loin de Paname (2002)	Amour(s) (2002)

Loin de Paname is the sixth studio album by French-Belgian singer Viktor Lazlo. The album consists of French chansons, such as "Les mots d'amour" by Édith Piaf.

The album peaked on the French album charts at No. 67 and remained on the charts for four weeks.

It was also released in Japan.

== Track listing ==
Titles: (Note: According to the inner liner notes of the album.)

1. "Les mots d'amour" (Michel Vaucaire / Charles Dumont) 3:33
2. "Sur ton épaule" (J. Larue / Alec Siniavine) 4:16
3. "Parlez-moi d'amour" (J. Lenoir) 3:36
4. "Mon amant de Saint-Jean" (Léon Agel / Émile Carrara) 3:34
5. "Je suis seule ce soir" (R. Noël / J. Casanova / P. Durand) 5:09
6. "La vagabonde" (Jean de Lettraz / Jean Delettre / Alec Siniavine) 5:18
7. "Le bal défendu" (Vincent Scotto) 3:46
8. "Mon légionnaire" (Raymond Asso / Marguerite Monnot) 4:37
9. "Où est-il donc?" (André Decaye / L. Carol / Vincent Scotto) 3:01
10. "La rue" (C. Gosselin / A. Fallot) 4:15
11. "La vipère" (Jean Rodor / Vincent Scotto) 5:48
12. "Après toi je n'aurai plus d'amour" (Géo Koger / Vincent Scotto) 3:58
13. "Tourbillon" (Pierre Dorsey) 2:19
14. "La coco" (Bouchaud / G. Ouvrard) 3:47
15. "La conga blicotti" (A. de Bade / A. Oresiche) 4:17

== Charts ==
Chart	Peak position
French Albums Chart	67
