= Sweet, Soft N' Lazy (The Exclusive Collection) =

Compilation album by Viktor Lazlo
- Released: 1990
- Genre: Pop, Pop jazz
- Label: Polydor, PolyGram
- Producer: Lou Deprijck

Viktor Lazlo chronology
Hot & Soul (1989)	Sweet, Soft N' Lazy (The Exclusive Collection) (1990)	My Delicious Poisons (1991)

Sweet, Soft N' Lazy (The Exclusive Collection) is the first compilation album by French-Belgian singer Viktor Lazlo.

The album was released following the success of Lazlo's German-French duet single Das erste Mal tat's noch weh with Stefan Waggershausen in Germany, Austria and Switzerland. The single peaked at No. 6 on the German single charts and was a massive success. The single Ansiedad was another success for Lazlo, charting in Germany and Belgium. It was also part of the official soundtrack for Lazlo's movie Boom Boom, a Spanish romantic comedy.

== Track listing ==
No.	Title	Writer(s)	origin	Length
1.	"Ansiedad"	José Enrique Sarabia	new track	4:06
2.	"Sweet, Soft N' Lazy"	Cl. Bofane, G. Cadiere, Viktor Lazlo	from She	5:20
3.	"Canoë Rose"	Boris Bergman, Ian Raven	from She	4:43
4.	"Premier Rôle" (French version of Hot & Soul)	Boris Bergman, Charles Geurts, Marc Nocquet	from Club Désert	3:24
5.	"Manhattan (Fais-Moi-Confiance)"	J. Walravens, Delperdange, de la Croix	new track	4:05
6.	"Syracuse"	H. Salvador	new track	2:56
7.	"Quiet Now"	Jack Van Poll	from Hot & Soul	3:16
8.	"Le Grisbi"	J. Wiener, M. Lanjean	from Club Désert	3:17
9.	"Champagne And Wine"	Danny Delaet, Silver van Holme	from Viktor Lazlo	2:43
10.	"Hey Baby, Cool"	David Gistelinck, Pierre van Dormael	from Viktor Lazlo	3:34
11.	"Ain't Gonna Come"	Pierre van Dormael, V. Lazlo	from She	4:00
12.	"In Your Arms"	J. Meeuwis, R. Schillebeeckx	from Viktor Lazlo	4:10
13.	"Das erste Mal tat's noch weh" (duet with Stefan Waggershausen)	L. Deprijck, S. Waggershausen	new track	3:34

== Charts ==
=== Album ===
Chart	Peak position
Dutch Albums Chart	63

=== Single releases ===
Year	Single	D	CH	AUT	BE
1990	Das erste Mal tat's noch weh	6	17	3	—
1990	Ansiedad	56	—	—	18
