= Back to Front (Viktor Lazlo album) =

Back To Front

Studio album by Viktor Lazlo
- Released: 1996
- Genre: Pop
- Labels: East West, Warner
- Producer: Eric Clermontet

Viktor Lazlo chronology
| Sweet, Soft & Lazy - The Very Best Of (1993) | Back To Front (1996) | Loin de Paname (2002) |

Back To Front is the fifth studio album by French-Belgian singer Viktor Lazlo. A French version of the album was recorded and released in France, entitled Verso. The album was her first album not to be released on Polydor Records but on East/West Records.

Lazlo had started to work on the album in 1992 according to East/West Records' press release. The album was recorded on the Bahamas. The album cover features a nude backside of Viktor Lazlo with jewels of Christian Lacroix in her hair. Lazlo explains the album cover as follows: "Up until now I have always been reduced to my looks and my fancy clothes to the extent that I often didn't know who I really was. I just didn't want to continue like that." In an interview with Het Nieuwsblad she continued: "I'm thrilled. An entire day of interviews, and no one has asked a thing about my clothes. For the first time in my career, they aren't talking about beauty or fashion, but about music. For the first time they are really interested in my music."

Two songs were written by Shelly Peiken and Albert Hammond, one of them being the song Have Mercy, which had previously been recorded by Yazz. The second Peiken/Hammond song, "Love Is On The Way", was co-written by [[Axelle Red]], a Belgian singer-songwriter, who originally released is in a french version in 1993, called "[[Sensualité]]", which single release was a hit in France in 1994. Among the guest musicians on this album were Sly and Robbie, responsible for drum programming and bass. (Note: According to the inner liner notes of the album.)

== Singles ==
Two singles were released off the album My Love (entitled Ces rêves in France) and Turn It All Around (entitled Babe in France). East/West Records shot videos for both singles, which can still be found on YouTube these days.

== Reviews ==
The German magazine Audio.de gave three out of five possible stars. David Jeffries wrote on AllMusic that reviews for Back To Front were "overwhelmingly positive".

== Track listing ==
International Version (Note: According to the inner liner notes of the album.)
| No. | Title | Writer(s) | Length |
|---|---|---|---|
| 1. | "Not The House" | Anthony Minghella, Peter Crosbie | 5:03 |
| 2. | "Turn It All Around" (Babe) | Viktor Lazlo, David Linx, André Manoukian | 4:11 |
| 3. | "My Love" (Ces rêves) | Lazlo, Linx, Manoukian | 3:31 |
| 4. | "Love Is On The Way" | Shelly Peiken, Albert Hammond | 3:44 |
| 5. | "Final Crash" (Je te connais) | Patrice Guirao, Art Mengo | 4:30 |
| 6. | "If I Go" (Gardez-moi) | Lazlo, Linx, Manoukian | 4:09 |
| 7. | "Come To Me" (Le non-voyage) | Guirao, Mengo | 4:20 |
| 8. | "Blow It Away" (Souffle de vie) | Fred de Fred, Lazlo, Linx | 4:52 |
| 9. | "It's Over" (C'est quoi un homme ?) | Lazlo, Linx, Manoukian | 3:42 |
| 10. | "Right or Wrong" | Kevin Jennings, Eric Clermontet | 4:30 |
| 11. | "Have Mercy" | Shelly Peiken, Albert Hammond | 4:07 |
| 12. | "Waiting For The Night" (Sale temps) | Michel Amsellem, Joëlle Kopf, David Linx | 4:57 |
| 13. | "Thou Shalt Not" | Sheila E, Jud Friedman, Allan Rich | 3:54 |
