= Raúl Paz =

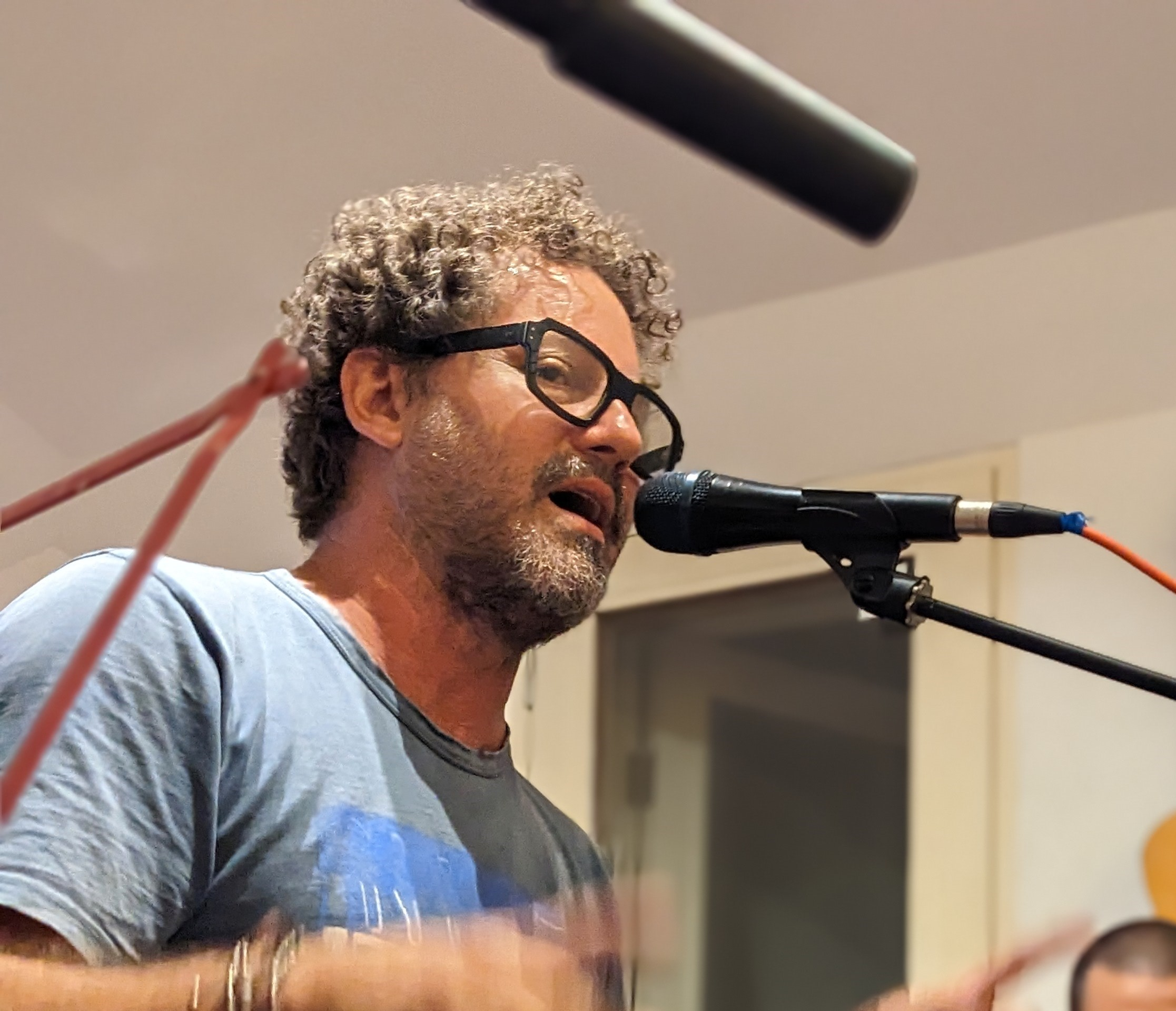
Image of Raul Paz

Raúl Paz (born 1969) in the province of Pinar del Río, in the west of Cuba. Commonly nicknamed the "French Cuban", he is known for having revolutionized the 21st century Cuban music.

== Biography ==
Raúl Paz learned to sing listening to guajira – country music made in Cuba. He spent ten years studying music at the Instituto Superior de Arte (ISA), a renowned arts academy in Havana : violin, musical theory, wind instruments, singing, counterpoint, and conducting.

After his very classical training, he discovered Deep Purple, Led Zeppelin and Bob Marley, tuning into American radio stations – rock being banned on government radio stations at that time.

Raúl Paz left Cuba in 1993, went to South America and then wound up in Paris, France, to study at the Schola Cantorum. He met there his wife, Rachelle, and later had two sons, Rocco his eldest, and Raphael. In the mid-1990s, Paris was a melting pot for music. Raul hung out on the Latino scene, playing in the clubs New Morning, Hot Brass and Bataclan. He became one of the pioneers of the new Cuban wave.

He was then spotted by Ralph Mercado, founder of the RMM label, and recorded his first album, Cuba Libre, in Gloria Estefan's studio in Miami. Renamed Imaginate for the American market, the record was a hit, selling some 100,000 copies and earning him the accolade "Best new male artist" in the US music press.

1998 he released a duet single of Besame Mucho with Viktor Lazlo for her album Amour(s). The song was also on the official soundtrack album of the German film Das merkwürdige Verhalten geschlechtsreifer Großstädter zur Paarungszeit.

After having played live in the US, Raúl Paz returned to Paris and settled down. He took an apartment close to Place du Colonel Fabien in the 20th district, and signed with Patrick Zelnik's label Naïve. The first fruit of this relationship was Mulata in 2003.

Raúl Paz reinterpreted Cuban music, weaving in hip-hop beats, dub, rock riffs and a groove all of his own. Mulata sold 60,000 copies. Revolución takes up where Mulata left off. Raúl Paz recorded the new album in Havana, last November, at the Egrem studios, where the albums of the famous Buena Vista Social Club were cut.

In 2001, he had his first son, Rocco. Years later came Raphael.

In 2005, Alfredo Arias gave Raúl Paz a leading part in Mambo Mystico, his last musical at the Théâtre national de Chaillot.

In 2007, Raúl Paz recorded the album called En Vivo on the label Naïve.

In 2010, Raúl Paz recorded the album called Havanization on the label Naïve.

== Discography ==
- Guajiro Chic (Colomo Production, 2025)
- El Puente (Bis Music, 2021)
- Vidas (Bis Music, 2018)
- La otra esquina (Egrem, 2015)
- Ven Ven (Naïve, 2014)
- Havanization (Naïve, 2010)
- Amigos X Paz Live Barcelona, with Carmen París, Greta, Habana Abierta, Enrique Heredia Negri (Rumor, 2008)
- En Vivo (Naïve, 2007)
- En Casa (Naïve, 2006)
- Revolución (Naïve, 2005)
- Mulata (Naïve, 2003)
- Blanco y Negro (RMM, 2001)
- Contigo (Kontor Records, 2000)
- Imagínate (RMM, 1999)
- Cuba Libre (Rue Bleu, 1999)
