= Mon légionnaire =

"Mon légionnaire" is a French song introduced in 1936 by vocalist Marie Dubas, with lyrics by Raymond Asso and music by Marguerite Monnot. Marie Dubas toured the United States with this song in 1939.

Édith Piaf started performing "Mon légionnaire" as a music hall singer in 1937.

== Writer ==
Raymond Asso was a veteran of the Foreign Legion, who also wrote "Le Fanion de la Légion" (The Flag of the Legion), which was taken up by Dubas and afterwards by Piaf, but with less success.

== Edith Piaf version ==
The song is now mainly identified with Édith Piaf, who took it up as a central element of her repertoire. It appears in most collections of Piaf's songs. The romantic theme of a woman's longing for an embittered Legionnaire who refuses to reveal his name, with whom she has a brief affair, fits well with Piaf's image.

== Cover versions ==
"Mon légionnaire" was recorded by Serge Gainsbourg in 1987; the male voice singing the lyrics made famous by Piaf gave the song a strong homoerotic undertone. This new version of "Mon légionnaire" was a hit on French dance floors, both gay and heterosexual.

French jazz singer Raquel Bitton performed the song as part of her Piaf tribute show "Piaf: Her Story, Her Songs".

The song was also covered by Viktor Lazlo for her album Loin de Paname.

A version with the lyrics translated into English appears on the 1981 album Spirit of St. Louis by Ellen Foley.

== See also ==
- French Foreign Legion in popular culture
