= My Delicious Poisons =

Studio album by Viktor Lazlo
- Released: 1991
- Genre: Pop
- Label: Polydor, PolyGram
- Producer: Bernard Lavilliers

Viktor Lazlo chronology
Sweet, Soft N' Lazy (1990)	My Delicious Poisons (1991)	Sweet, Soft & Lazy - The Very Best Of (1993)

My Delicious Poisons is the fourth studio album by French-Belgian singer Viktor Lazlo. A French version of the album was recorded and released in France, entitled Mes Poisons Délicieux. The album was not as successful as its predecessors as it only entered the Dutch album charts, peaking at No. 71.

The first single off the album, Teach Me To Dance was co-written by Lazlo herself with Chris Rea. The album also contains a cover version of the Elkie Brooks song Pearl's a Singer.

Singles off the album were Teach Me To Dance, Love Insane and Ballad For Lisa.

== Track listing ==
No.	Title	Writer(s)	Length
1.	"Teach Me To Dance"	Chris Rea, Viktor Lazlo	4:04
2.	"Ballad For Lisa"	Pierre Roger, Viktor Lazlo	3:40
3.	"Love Insane"	Viktor Lazlo, André Manoukian	3:55
4.	"Pearl's a Singer"	Jerry Leiber, Mike Stoller, Ralph Dino, John Anthony Sembello	3:25
5.	"Lullaby"	Viktor Lazlo, David Linx	3:29
6.	"Men Of A Kind"	Viktor Lazlo, Felix Kautzky	4:00
7.	"Light And Dark"	Viktor Lazlo, Françoise Hardy, Khalil Chahine	4:00
8.	"If I Could Love You More"	Viktor Lazlo, Sebastian Santa Maria	3:40
9.	"Desir Fou"	Viktor Lazlo, David Linx	3:15
10.	"Easy To Lose"	Herve Pennequin, Fabien Caux Lahalle	2:57
11.	"Poison" (Bonus track on the CD edition)	Viktor Lazlo, Brenda Russell	3:55

== Charts ==
Chart	Peak position
Dutch Albums Chart	71
