= Jazet =

Jazet is a surname. Notable people with the surname include:

- Erik Jazet (born 1971), Dutch field hockey player
- Jean-Pierre-Marie Jazet (1788–1871), French engraver
- Paul-Léon Jazet (1848–1918), French painter
