= Amour(s) =

Studio album by Viktor Lazlo
- Released: 2002
- Genre: Pop
- Label: Monopol Records (Europe) / JVC Victor (Japan)
- Producer: Sergio Dall'ora / Theo Spagna

Viktor Lazlo chronology
Loin de Paname (2002)	Amour(s) (2002)	Saga (2004)

Alternative cover
- Japanese cover of 'Amour(s)'

Amour(s) is the seventh studio album by French-Belgian singer Viktor Lazlo. It was released in 2002 in Germany, Austria, Switzerland, Japan and other countries. Another album, Loin de Paname, consisting of chansons, was released in France the same year.

Lazlo started recording Amour(s) in Verona, Italy in the year 2000. The album was produced by Theo Spagna, who is responsible for many hits of Italian singer Spagna, and Sergio Dall'ora.

The album includes the hit single It's A Message For You, a duet with Biagio Antonacci, which peaked at No. 7 on the Belgian single charts and remained on the charts for 17 weeks. The CD single contains the original Italian/English and an Italian/French version, entitled Le Message Est Pour Toi. The single received gold status in Belgium for more than 50,000 sold copies.

Another single off the album is the duet Besame Mucho with Raul Paz, which was released as a CD single in Germany and was on the official soundtrack album of the German film Das merkwürdige Verhalten geschlechtsreifer Großstädter zur Paarungszeit. The soundtrack peaked on the German album charts at No. 94. The song Sound of Expectation was released as a promotional single.

== Track listing ==
European Version
No.	Title	Writer(s)	Length
1.	"Someone"	F. Monthieu, Viktor Lazlo	3:52
2.	"Fleur"	Biagio Antonacci, Viktor Lazlo	4:32
3.	"Si Moi, Si Lui"	Biagio Antonacci, Viktor Lazlo	4:19
4.	"Gone With The Wind"	F. Monthieu, Viktor Lazlo	4:00
5.	"If One More day" (duet with David Linx)	David Linx, Diederik Wissels	5:06
6.	"Danse"	Viktor Lazlo, Sergio Dall'ora	4:18
7.	"En Cas D'Amour"	Biagio Antonacci, Viktor Lazlo	4:10
8.	"Overjoyed"	Stevie Wonder	4:17
9.	"The Sound Of Expectation"	Viktor Lazlo, Sergio Dall'ora	4:01
10.	"Don't Ask"	Daddy Waku, Guy Waku, Marie-Ange Teeuwen, V. Lazlo	3:32
11.	"10,000 Miles"	traditional	3:55
12.	"It's A Message For You" (duet with Biagio Antonacci)	Biagio Antonacci, Viktor Lazlo	3:45
13.	"Besame Mucho" (duet with Raul Paz)	Consuelo Velázquez, R. Paz	3:27
14.	"Girl from Ipanema"	Antônio Carlos Jobim, Vinícius de Moraes	3:57

== Charts ==
=== Single releases ===
Year	Single	BE
1999	It's A Message For You	7
