= Jean Boulet =

Jean Boulet may refer to:

- Jean Boulet (aviator)
- Jean Boulet (politician)

== See also ==
- Jean Boullet, French artist
