= Hot & Soul =

Studio album by Viktor Lazlo
- Released: 1989
- Genre: Pop, Pop jazz
- Label: Polydor, PolyGram
- Producer: Lou Deprijck

Viktor Lazlo chronology
Viktor Lazlo (1987)	Hot & Soul (1989)	Sweet, Soft N' Lazy (1990)

Hot & Soul is the third studio album by French-Belgian singer Viktor Lazlo. A French version of the album was recorded and released in France, entitled Club Desert.

The first single off the album, City Never Sleeps, was written by Rob Davis who would later go on to write the worldwide hit Can't Get You Out of My Head for Kylie Minogue. The single charted on the Dutch single charts.

Other singles to be released off the album were In The Midnight Sky, Amour Puissance Six and the song Baisers, which was only included on the French version of the album.

== Track listing ==
International Edition
No.	Title	Writer(s)	Length
1.	"City Never Sleeps"	Rob Davis	4:12
2.	"Hot & Soul"	Boris Bergman, Charles Geurts, David Linx, Marc Nocquet, Viktor Lazlo	4:14
3.	"In The Midnight Sky"	Evert Verhees, Jan Walravens, Patricia Maessen	4:34
4.	"Long Distance"	Claude Bofane, Guy Bernard Cadiere, Joëlle Kopf, Maxime Leforestier	4:09
5.	"Fever"	Marc Moulin	4:28
6.	"Tell Me "Pourquoi Pas""	David Linx, Nicolas Fiszman	3:52
7.	"Quiet Now"	Jack Van Poll	3:16
8.	"Wish You Were Here"	Christophe Vervoort, David Linx, Roland Bindi, Viktor Lazlo	5:39
9.	"Amour Puissance Six"	laude Bofane, Guy Bernard Cadiere, Serge Gainsbourg, Viktor Lazlo	5:24
10.	"Pygmy World"	Raphaël Schillebeeckx	4:07

== Charts ==
=== Album ===
Chart	Peak position
German Albums Chart	22
Swiss Albums Chart	22
Dutch Albums Chart	30

=== Single releases ===
Year	Single	NL
1989	City Never Sleeps	53
