= Loie Fuller =

American dancer (1862–1928)

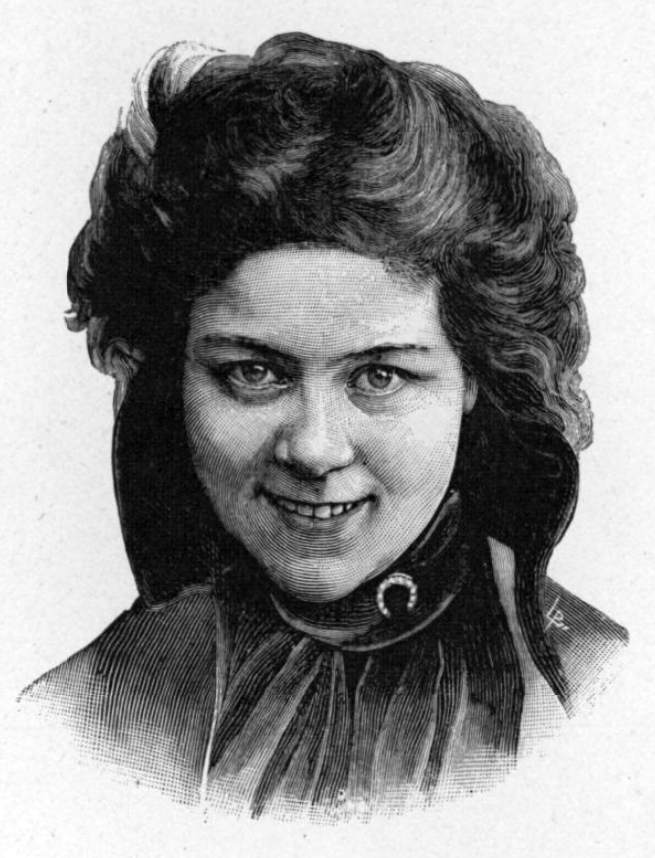
- Fuller in 1900
- Born: Marie Louise Fuller; January 15, 1862; Hinsdale, Illinois, U.S.
- Died: January 1, 1928 (aged 65); Paris, France
- Resting place: Père Lachaise Cemetery, Paris, France
- Other name: Louie Fuller
- Occupations: Dancer and choreographer
- Partner: Gab Sorère (1898–1928)

Loie Fuller (/ˈloʊi/; born Marie Louise Fuller; January 15, 1862 – January 1, 1928), also known as Louie Fuller and Loïe Fuller, was an American dancer and a pioneer of modern dance and theatrical lighting techniques.

Auguste Rodin said of her, "Loie Fuller has paved the way for the art of the future."

== Biography ==
=== Early life and debut ===
Marie Louise Fuller was born on January 15, 1862, in Fullersburg, Illinois, on a remote farm conveniently linked to Chicago by a newly-constructed plank road. When Fuller was two, her parents Reuben Fuller and Delilah Eaton moved to Chicago and opened a boarding house. Her early exposure to the arts came through her parents - her father was a skilled fiddler and dance caller, while her mother had aspired to be an opera singer before marriage. Fuller's parents took her to the Progressive Lyceum, a hub of Freethought, on Sunday mornings.

Fuller debuted on the stage as a toddler, performing a variety of dramatic and dance roles in Chicago. Her first performance, according to her memoir, was reciting "Mary Had a Little Lamb" at a Sunday school event. Her formal dramatic debut at the age of four was at the Chicago Academy of Music, playing a young boy in Was He Right?. Fuller's career as a child performer progressed with little formal training and much variety, as she experimented with dramatic reading, singing, and dance. From 1878 to 1879, she toured with the Felix A. Vincent Company, performing in "Aladdin," a pantomime spectacle filled with magical scene transformations. This experience exposed her to important principles of stagecraft.

When Fuller was a child, her family moved in and out of Chicago, with Fuller eventually securing a part in Buffalo Bill's touring act at the age of nineteen. From 1881 to 1889, she performed in western melodramas and musical burlettas in New York City and the Midwest, with notable roles in "Davy Crockett" (1882) and "Twenty Days, or Buffalo Bill's Pledge" (1883).

Despite her initial success, Fuller faced significant financial challenges early in her career. In 1889, she attempted to expand her career by venturing into production, traveling to London to mount and star in the play "Caprice." This endeavor proved to be both a critical and financial failure, leaving Fuller broke and unemployed in London. Following this setback, Fuller's fortunes changed when she secured a role as an understudy at London's Gaiety Theatre, known for its skirt dances. This engagement proved pivotal, as it exposed her to a dance form that would influence her later innovations.

Marie Louise Fuller changed her name to the more glamorous "Loïe" at the age of sixteen. An early free dance practitioner, she developed her own natural movement and improvisation techniques. In 1889, she visited the Paris Exposition Universelle, where she was particularly impressed by the Palais d'électricité and the illuminated fountains of the Champs de Mars, which greatly influenced the innovative use of lighting in her performances. In multiple shows she experimented with a long skirt, choreographing its movements and playing with the ways it could reflect light.

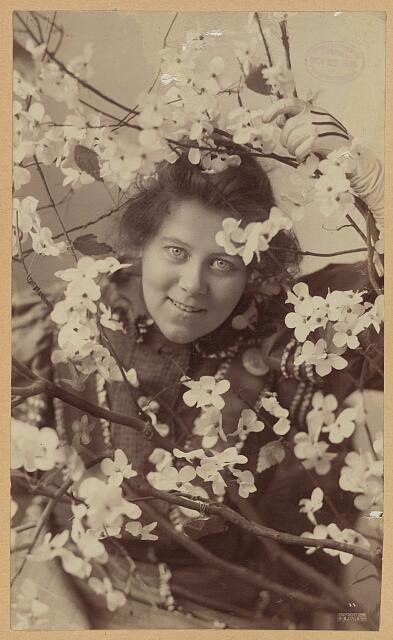
Dancer and actress Loie Fuller, half-length portrait, standing facing front, looking through the branches of a flowering tree.

=== Career ===
By 1891, Fuller was combining her choreography with silk costumes illuminated by multi-coloured lighting of her own design and created the "Serpentine Dance". Fuller created gels that she colored to create different effects with the lighting. She attached the gels to revolving lamps to allow herself to change the colors at whim. This usage of gels to illuminate her fabrics was a well-known feature of her performances. Her reputation as an actress made it difficult to generate interest as a dance performer. Eventually Rudolph Aronson of New York's Casino Theatre hired her to perform her piece, which he named "The Serpentine", between the acts of a comedy entitled Uncle Celestine and she received rave reviews. After a dispute with Aronson she moved to the Madison Square Theatre.

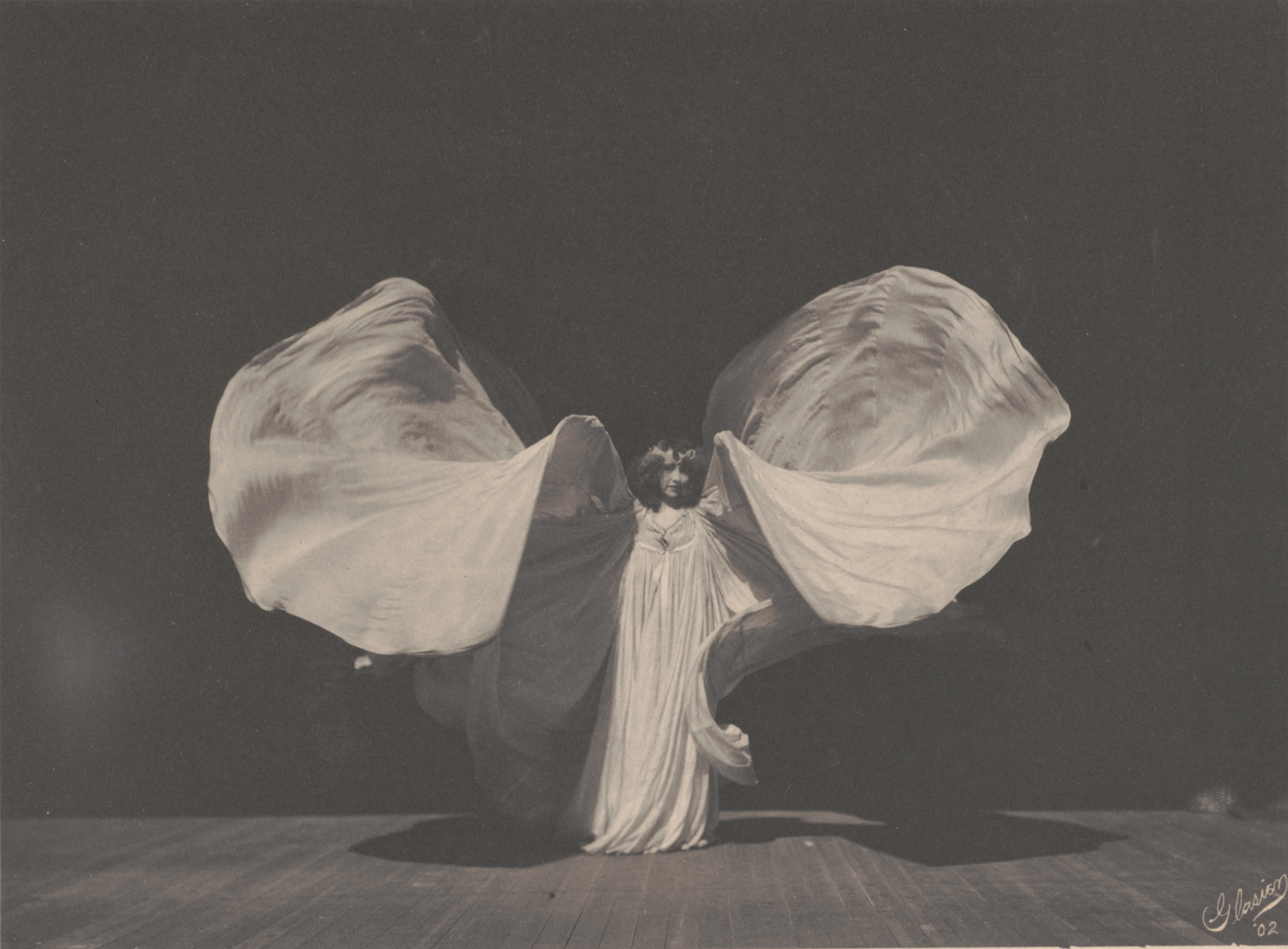
Portrait of Fuller by Frederick Glasier, 1902

Almost immediately, she was replaced by imitators (originally Minnie "Renwood" Bemis). Fuller's innovative choreography led to legal challenges as she sought to protect her work. In 1892, she filed a lawsuit against imitator Minnie Renwood Bemis in an attempt to secure intellectual property rights for her Serpentine Dance. The case, Fuller v. Bemis, became a landmark in dance copyright law. Despite Fuller's precaution of submitting a written description of her dance to the U.S. Copyright Office, the U.S. Circuit Court denied her request for an injunction. The court ruled that the Serpentine Dance told no story and was therefore not eligible for copyright protection as a dramatic composition, which was the only category under which dance could potentially be protected at the time. The judge stated: "A stage dance illustrating the poetry of motion by a series of graceful movements, combined with an attractive arrangement of drapery, lights and shadows, but telling no story, portraying no character and depicting no emotion, is not a 'dramatic composition' within the meaning of the Copyright Act." The law during this time required a dance to tell a story in order for that dance to be protected under copyright laws. The court determined Fuller's dances did not tell a story and so could not be protected under the law. The precedent set by Fuller's case remained in place until the passage of the Copyright Act of 1976, which explicitly extended protection to nondramatic choreographic works. Another notorious imitator was Lord Yarmouth, later 7th Marquess of Hertford, who performed the Serpentine Dance under the stage name of ‘Mademoiselle Roze’. Fuller's pursuit of copyright protection was part of a broader struggle for artistic recognition and control over her work in a male-dominated theatrical industry. As a performer selling her live enactment of the Serpentine Dance in the theatrical marketplace, Fuller's body circulated in commodity form. Her attempts to protect her performing body from becoming fully open to capital by asserting property rights over her image and choreography marked a complex negotiation between her status as artist and commodity.

In the hope of receiving serious artistic recognition denied her in America, Fuller left for Europe in June 1892, one of the first of many American modern dancers to seek recognition in Europe. Her warm reception in Paris persuaded Fuller to remain in France, where she became one of the leading revolutionaries in the arts. While Fuller is mainly known for her intricate performances involving long fabrics and her use of gels to create unique lighting designs, she inspired others in different ways. During Fuller's time, it was common for female dancers to wear minimal clothing to seduce men. Fuller defied this expectation by wearing long fabrics that covered her body. Fuller was admired for her ability to capture the attention of male audiences without the need for seduction. Fuller opened a new path for female dancers to perform without the expectation of wearing minimal clothing.

A regular performer at the Folies Bergère with works such as Fire Dance, Fuller became the embodiment of the Art Nouveau movement and was often identified with symbolism, as her work was seen as the perfect reciprocity between idea and symbol. In Fire Dance, the floor was made of glass with lamps of different colored gels beneath her to illuminate her fabrics while she performed. The light was shone on her long, moving fabrics from many different directions, creating the illusion of fire, hence the name Fire Dance. Fuller began adapting and expanding her costume and lighting, so that they became the principal element in her performance—perhaps even more important than the actual choreography, especially as the length of the skirt was increased and became the central focus, while the body became mostly hidden within the depths of the fabric. Revolving gels of different colors were shone on Fuller to illuminate the fabrics while she performed. The gels were used to color the fabrics while Fuller performed for the audience. The colors from the gels allowed Fuller to transform into various shapes on stage, most notably, fire from her Fire Dance. The choreography of the Serpentine Dance was filmed by multiple early filmmakers, including Auguste and Louis Lumière, but it is unclear whether the recordings depict Fuller herself.

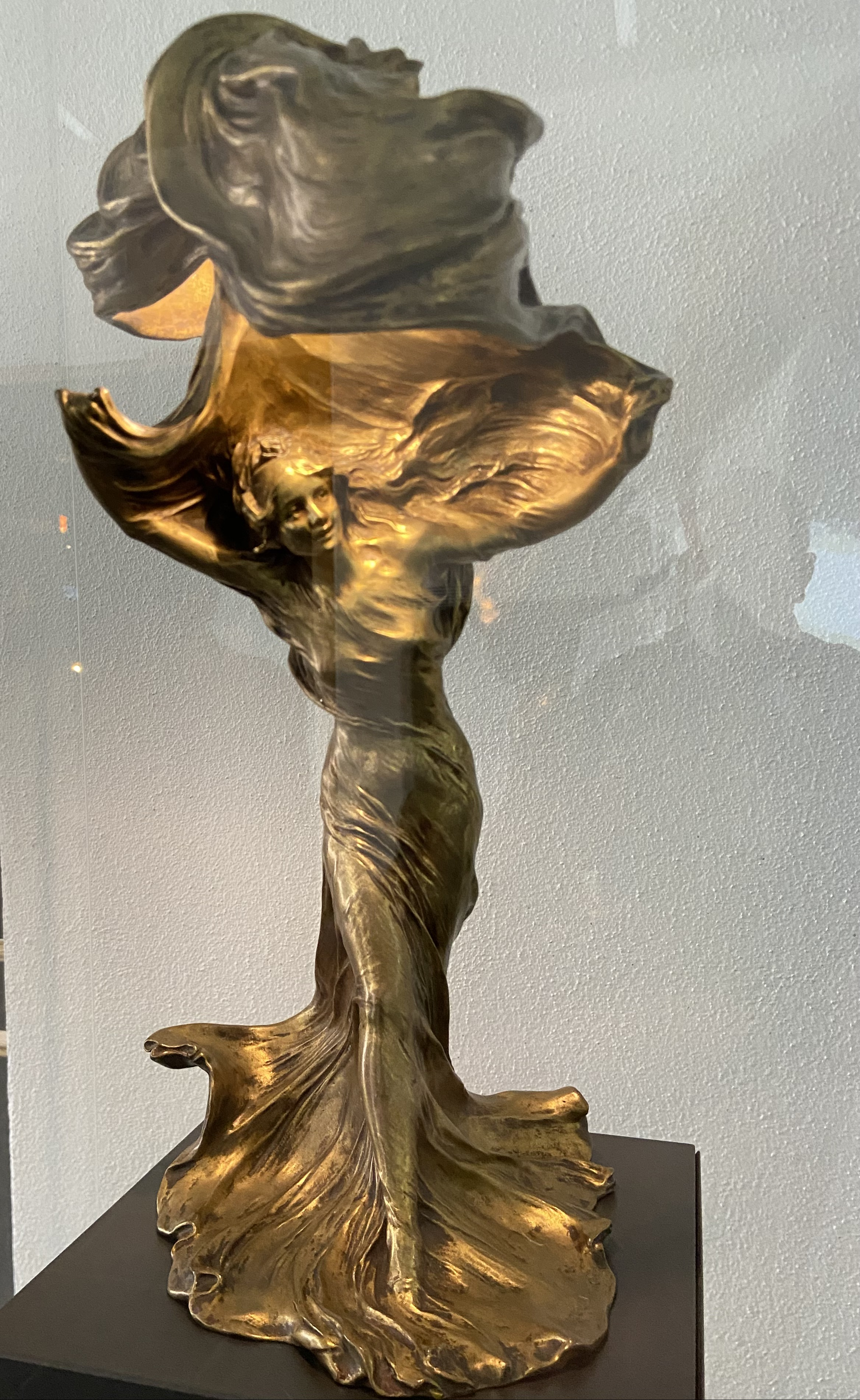
Table lamp: Dance of the Lily (Loie Fuller) – around 1901-Gilt bronze-Museum Wiesbaden-Raoul Larche (1860–1912)

Gab Sorère and Fuller made three films together: Le Lys de la vie (The Lily of Life, 1921), Visions des rêves (Visions of dreams, 1924), and Les Incertitudes de Coppélius (Uncertainties of Coppelius, 1927). Le Lys de la vie was a silent film based upon a story written by Queen Marie of Romania, a close friend of the couple. Of the three, only a reel of the first survives. It depicts "a show within a show with classically-costumed figures dancing by the sea, a banquet, royal intrigue, and romance with René Clair featured as a prince on horseback". The singer Damia had persuaded Clair to participate by describing the beautiful women who would be dancing.

Fuller at the Folies Bergère, poster by PAL (Jean de Paléologue)

Fuller's pioneering work attracted the attention, respect, and friendship of many French artists and scientists, including Jules Chéret, Henri de Toulouse-Lautrec, François-Raoul Larche, Henri-Pierre Roché, Auguste Rodin, Jean-Léon Gérôme, Franz von Stuck, Maurice Denis, Thomas Theodor Heine, Paul-Léon Jazet, Koloman Moser, Demétre Chiparus, Stéphane Mallarmé, and Marie Curie.

Fuller was also a member of the Société astronomique de France (French Astronomical Society). Fuller patented many of her innovations in stage lighting, including the use of chemical compounds for creating color gel, and the application of chemical salts to luminescent lighting and garments. Fuller is known as a performer, but she was also an inventor. Fuller created everything she patented herself with little knowledge of stage designs, or fabric designs. Fuller was an artist with little training prior to her performances or inventions.

Fuller supported other pioneering performers, such as Sada Yacco and fellow United States-born dancer Isadora Duncan. Fuller helped Duncan ignite her European career in 1902 by sponsoring independent concerts in Vienna and Budapest.

A dancer, possibly Fuller, performing Fuller's serpentine dance in a 1902 film

=== Personal life ===
Fuller met her romantic partner of over 30 years, Gab Sorère, in the mid-1890s. Sorère was born Gabrielle Bloch, the daughter of wealthy French bankers, in 1870, and took the name Gab Sorère in 1920. Bloch first saw Fuller perform at the age of 14, and by 1898 Fuller and Bloch were living together. Fuller and Bloch's lesbian relationship initially attracted some attention in the press, as Bloch dressed exclusively in menswear and was eight years Fuller's junior. Press coverage of their relationship declined over time.

Fuller met Crown Princess Marie of Romania, later to become Queen Marie, in 1902, at a performance in Bucharest. Marie and Fuller became close friends and maintained an extensive correspondence. Their relationship was the subject of scandalous rumors, alleging that Fuller and Queen Marie were lovers. Fuller, through a connection at the United States embassy in Paris, played a role in arranging a United States loan for Romania during World War I.

Fuller befriended the future Carol II of Romania when he was living in Paris with his mistress Magda Lupescu and alienated from the Romanian royal family. The couple remained unaware of Fuller's relationship with Carol's mother Marie. Fuller first advocated on their behalf to Marie, but she later schemed unsuccessfully with Marie to separate Carol from Lupescu. With Queen Marie and the American businessman Samuel Hill, Fuller helped found the Maryhill Museum of Art in rural Washington state, which has permanent exhibits about her career.

=== Later years and death ===
Fuller occasionally returned to America to stage performances by her students, the "Fullerets" or Muses, but spent most of her final years in Paris. There she died of pneumonia at the age of 65 on January 1, 1928, two weeks shy of her 66th birthday. She was cremated and her remains placed in the columbarium of the Père-Lachaise cemetery (site No. 5382) in Paris.

== Legacy ==
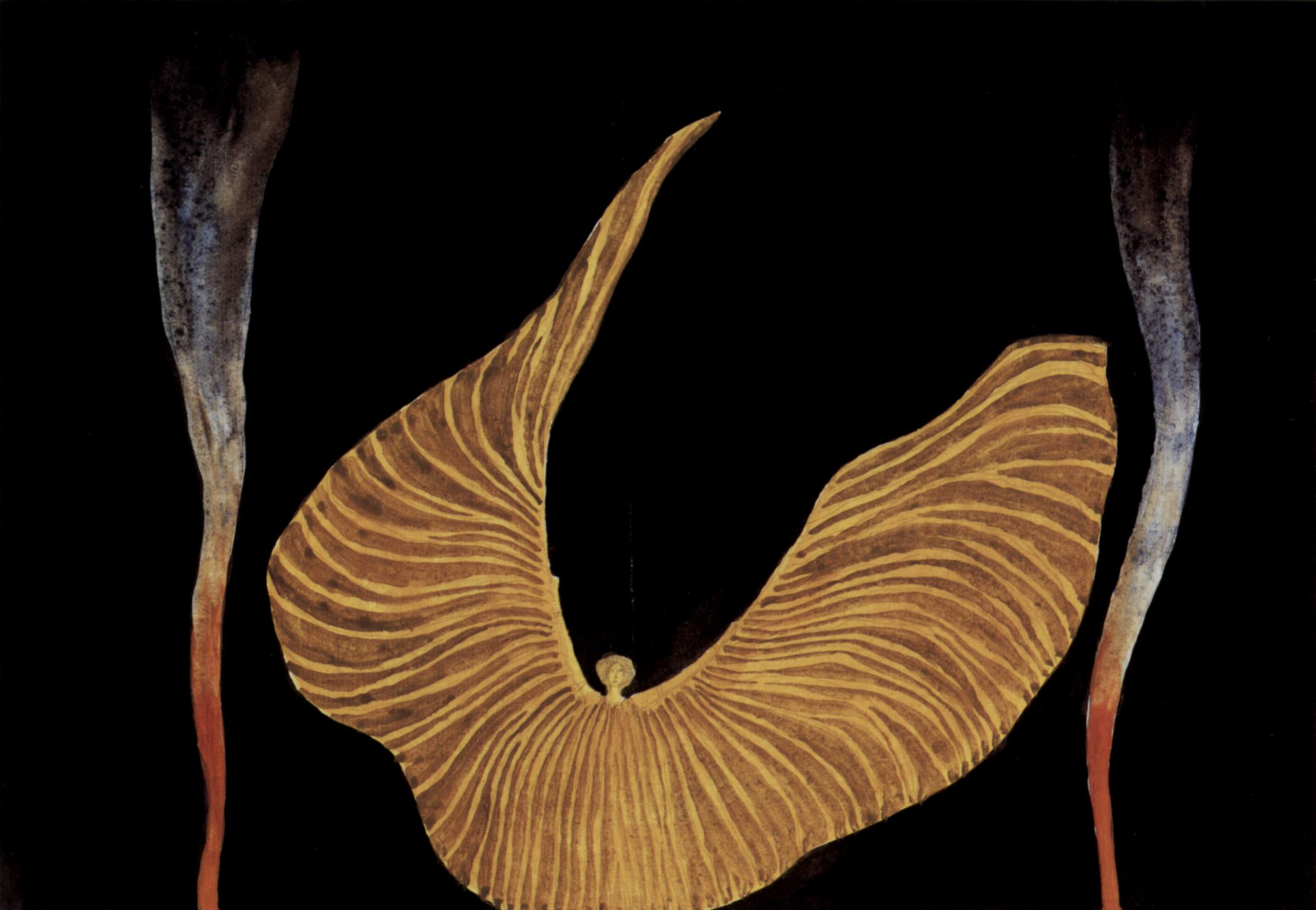
Fuller depicted by Koloman Moser (1901)

After Fuller's death, her romantic partner of thirty years, Gab Sorère inherited the dance troupe as well as the laboratory Fuller had operated. Sorère took legal action against dancers who wrongfully used Fuller's fame to enhance their own careers and produced both films and theatrical productions to honor Fuller's legacy as a visual effects artist.

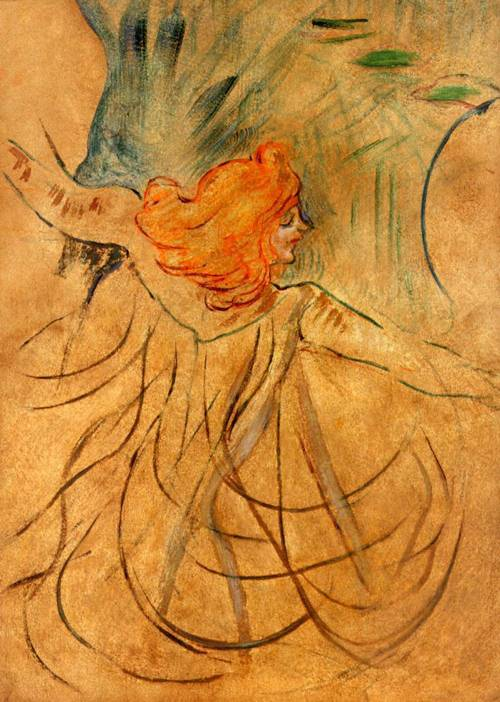
Fuller painted by Toulouse-Lautrec (1892)

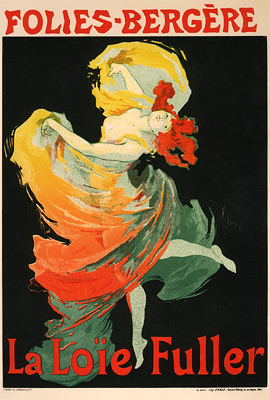
Poster featuring Fuller at the Folies Bergère by Jules Chéret

Fuller's work has been experiencing a resurgence of professional and public interest. Rhonda K. Garelick's 2009 study entitled Electric Salome demonstrates her centrality not only to dance, but also modernist performance. Sally R. Sommer has written extensively about Fuller's life and times Marcia and Richard Current published a biography entitled Loie Fuller, Goddess of Light in 1997. The philosopher Jacques Rancière devoted a chapter of Aisthesis, his history of modern aesthetics, to Fuller's 1893 performances in Paris, which he considers emblematic of Art Nouveau in their attempt to link artistic and technological invention. Giovanni Lista compiled a 680-page book of Fuller-inspired art work and texts in Loïe Fuller, Danseuse de la Belle Epoque in 1994. In the 1980s, Munich dancer Brygida Ochaim revived Fuller's dances and techniques, also appearing in the Claude Chabrol film The Swindler.

In 2016, Stéphanie Di Giusto directed the movie The Dancer about the life of Loïe Fuller, with actresses Soko as Loïe and Lily-Rose Depp as Isadora Duncan. Jody Sperling choreographed Soko's dances for the movie, served as creative consultant and was Soko's dance coach, training her in Fuller technique, which earned Sperling a World Choreography Award nomination. The movie premiered at the 2016 Cannes Film Festival.

Commissioned by the Paul Taylor Dance Company for their November 2024 Lincoln Center Season, Sperling developed Vive La Loïe, an expansion upon material created for La Danseuse (The Dancer) with the Loïe character performing atop a box containing lights within. The work for the Taylor company mines Fuller’s synaesthetic concept of “color harmony” in which multi-hued lights are composed like musical notes into luminous “melodies” and “chords.” Sperling collaborated closely with Bessie Award-winning lighting designer David Ferri so that each dance moment unfolds as a synthesis of motion, emotion, fabric, and light.

Fuller continues to be an influence on contemporary choreographers. Sperling has choreographed dozens of works inspired by Fuller and expanded Fuller's vocabulary and technique into the 21st century. Sperling's company, Time Lapse Dance, consists of six female-identifying dancers who are all versed in Fuller-style technique and performance. The company reimagines the art of Fuller in the context of contemporary and environmental forms.

Ann Cooper Albright collaborated with a lighting designer on a series of works that drew inspiration from Fuller's original lighting design patents. Shela Xoregos choreographed a tribute, La Loȉe, a solo which employs several of Fuller's special effects.

Taylor Swift's 2018 Reputation Tour featured a segment dedicated to Fuller. During her performance of "Dress" each night on the tour, several dancers recreated the Serpentine Dance. In the Reputation Stadium Tour concert film, Taylor's dedication to Fuller follows the performance of "Dress".

Into the 2019 film Radioactive Loie Fuller (Drew Jacoby) is a friend of the main character Marie Curie. The scientist envisions Fuller dancing in the green light of radium. The dancer also introduces the Curies to a medium.

In 2025 the documentary film Obsessed with Light was released, chronicling Loïe Fuller's life and legacy.

== Written works ==
- Fuller, Loie (1908). Quinze ans de ma vie [Fifteen years of my life]. Translated by Karageorgevitch, Bojidar. Paris: F. Juven.
- Fuller, Loie (1913). Fifteen years of a dancer's life, with some account of her distinguished friends. London: H. Jenkins.

Fuller's autobiographical memoir Quinze ans de ma vie was written in English, translated into French by Bojidar Karageorgevitch, and published by F. Juven (Paris) in 1908 with an introduction by Anatole France. She drafted her memoirs again in English a few years later. These were published under the title Fifteen Years of a Dancer's Life by H. Jenkins (London) in 1913. The New York Public Library Jerome Robbins Dance Collection holds the nearly complete manuscript of the English edition and materials related to the French edition. Fuller's autobiographical writings are in part fiction: she was known for being very adaptive in her story telling. She describes her invention of the Serpentine Dance and proposes her own theories of modern dance and motion.

== See also ==
- List of dancers
- Women in dance
