= Gab Sorère =

French visual artist and choreographer (1870–1961)

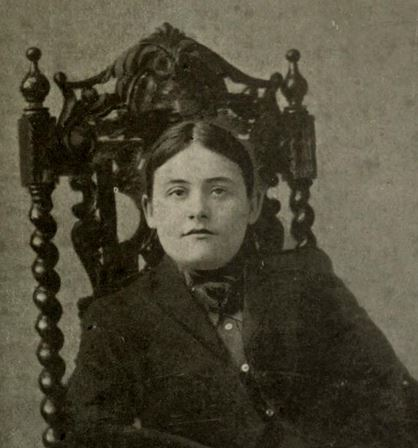
- Bloch, circa 1913
- Born: Gabrielle Bloch; 17 February 1870; Toul, Lorraine, France
- Died: 14 July 1961 (aged 91); Paris, France
- Other names: Gaby Bloch; Gaby Sorère
- Occupations: Choreographer, visual effects artist and art promoter
- Years active: 1898–1950s
- Partner(s): Loie Fuller (1898–1928; her death); Damia (1928–1961)

Gabrielle Bloch (17 February 1870 – 14 July 1961), known professionally as Gab Sorère, was a French art promoter, set designer, mechanical innovator, filmmaker and choreographer of the Belle Époque. Collaborating with her partner, Loïe Fuller, to explore illusion through luminescence, she produced films and choreographies which moved performance from dancers being lighted to the abstract vision of lights dancing. When Fuller died, Sorère inherited the dance troupe and laboratory of her partner and strove to keep her legacy as a visual effects artist alive. She continued to produce innovative productions utilizing fluorescence and light into the 1950s.

== Early life ==
Gabrielle Bloch was born in Toul, Lorraine, France, on 17 February 1870, and was the privileged daughter of a French banker, Julien Bloch (1843–1930). Her mother, Laura (1847–1925), wrote the book Au loin, impressions hindoues (1898). She studied at home, reading Schopenhauer by the age of nine and studying the literature of ancient India by sixteen. This may have been the trip recorded by her mother in the travelogue, which recounted visits to Ceylon, the Himalayas and northern India. Bloch first saw Loïe Fuller perform at her Paris debut in 1892, when her mother took her to the performance. She was familiar with the women in Natalie Barney's and Gertrude Stein's salons, which included Romaine Brooks, Eileen Gray, and Marie-Louise Damien, a singer better known as Damia, but like Gray.

== Career ==
By 1898, Sorère was living with Fuller, stirring controversy for being openly lesbian; Fuller being eight years older than Bloch; and the latter's penchant for routinely dressing as a man. During World War I, Bloch established a relief service to transport clothing and food supplies to Belgium and northern France. She was instrumental in urging Fuller to open a dance school to prevent her rival Isadora Duncan from gaining the upper hand with students. Bloch took the professional name of Gab Sorère around 1920, and collaborated with Fuller, while working as a promoter of other artists. Fuller was the performer of the duo and Sorère worked as a stage designer and invented mechanical props, branching into filmmaking. The two women would make three films together, Le Lys de la vie (The Lily of Life, 1921), Visions des rêves (Visions of dreams, 1924) and Les Incertitudes de Coppélius (Uncertainties of Coppelius, 1927). Le Lys de la vie was a silent film, based upon a story written by Queen Marie of Romania, a close friend of the couple and is the only one of the films which survived.

The only surviving reel of her work is a segment from Le Lys de la Vie, and features a show within a show with classically-costumed figures dancing by the sea, a banquet, royal intrigue, and romance with René Clair featured as a prince on horseback.

When she was not collaborating with Fuller, Sorère ran the furniture gallery and interior decorating salon owned by Eileen Gray. The gallery, known as Jean Désert, was open from 1922 to 1930. During this time, in 1926, Sorère and Fuller accompanied Queen Marie on a tour of the United States. The following year, Fuller became ill during the filming of Les Incertitudes de Coppélius and production was broken off while Sorère nursed her. The film was based upon E. T. A. Hoffmann's story, The Sandman and featured the dancers of Fuller's troupe. When she became ill with pneumonia, the dancers were sent on tour to Cairo and Sorère, who was directing the film, made plans for its completion after their return. Fuller died in 1928 and Sorère inherited both the business and the laboratory where the two women conducted experiments with lighting and paint. She was protective of Fuller's legacy and was known to sue dancers who misrepresented themselves as having affiliations with Fuller or her dance troupe.

After Fuller's death, Sorère became the partner of Damia and continued to experiment with phosphorescent salts to achieve theatrical lighting effects. The 1934 film La Féerie des Ballets fantastiques de Loïe Fuller, produced by George R. Busby, featured choreography by Sorère, who had reconstructed some of Fuller's dances. Though the storyline was weak, the film was memorable for the techniques employed to alter dimension and perspective by using rapid elongation and foreshortening. Four years later, in 1938, Sorère produced Ballets et Lumières with the Mazda company as a tribute to Fuller, using blacklight and fluorescent paint. Taking well-known Fuller dances, like the Fire Dance and including new choreography of her own, Sorère was able to make the dancers disappear, leaving the audience with only a vision of the movement of light. Though the application of this technology was Sorère's invention, as Fuller had died before exploring blacklight, critical acclaim for the production and innovation of moving dancers from performing in the light to an abstract performance of lights dancing, was given to Fuller. Sorère continued producing choreographies through the 1950s.
