= Love Scenes from Planet Earth =

1998 German romantic comedy film

- Directed by: Marc Rothemund
- Written by: Peter Gersina
- Starring: Christoph Waltz; Ann-Kathrin Kramer; Heio von Stetten; Michaela May; Anica Dobra
- Cinematography: Hans-Günther Bücking
- Music by: Reinhard Besser
- Production company: Sam Film Produktion
- Distributed by: Buena Vista International
- Release date: 27 August 1998 (Germany)
- Running time: 85 minutes
- Country: Germany
- Language: German

Das merkwürdige Verhalten geschlechtsreifer Großstädter zur Paarungszeit (English title – Love Scenes from Planet Earth) is a 1998 German romantic comedy film. It earned the director Marc Rothemund a Bavarian Film Award for "Best Young Director". It was the second highest grossing domestic film in Germany in 1998.

== Synopsis ==
The plot revolves around the lives of eight Germans who long for sexual excitement.

== Cast ==
- Christoph Waltz
- Ann-Kathrin Kramer
- Heio von Stetten
- Michaela May
- Anica Dobra
- Dieter Landuris
- Oliver Korittke
- Isabella Parkinson
- Markus Knüfken
- Cosma Shiva Hagen
- Tobias Schenke
- Gudrun Landgrebe
- Bernd Tauber
- Jakob von Moers
- Frederic Welter

== Soundtrack ==
1. Scatman John - Scatmambo (Patricia)
2. Talk Of The Town - Te Quiero Mambo
3. Willy DeVille - Demasiado Corazon
4. Gipsy Kings - Volare 3:40
5. Viktor Lazlo - Amores (Besame Mucho)
6. Compay Segundo - Chan Chan
7. Afro-Cuban All Stars - Amor Verdadero
8. Dean Martin - That's Amore
9. Jackeline Castellanos & Los Tropicales - Tu Libertad
10. D.A. Niel - Guarachando
11. Princessa - Baila Al Ritmo
12. Angelo Garcia - Carino Presumido
13. Compay Segundo - El Camison De Pepa
14. Rubén González - Tumbao
15. Gloria Estefan - Oye Mi Canto
16. Sierra Maestra - Tibiri Tabara
17. Dos Amigos - Mambo
18. Louis Prima - Buona Sera
19. Cherie - Charlie's Blues
20. Reinhard Besser - Score Trilogy

The soundtrack peaked on the German album charts at No. 94.
