= François-Raoul Larche =

French sculptor

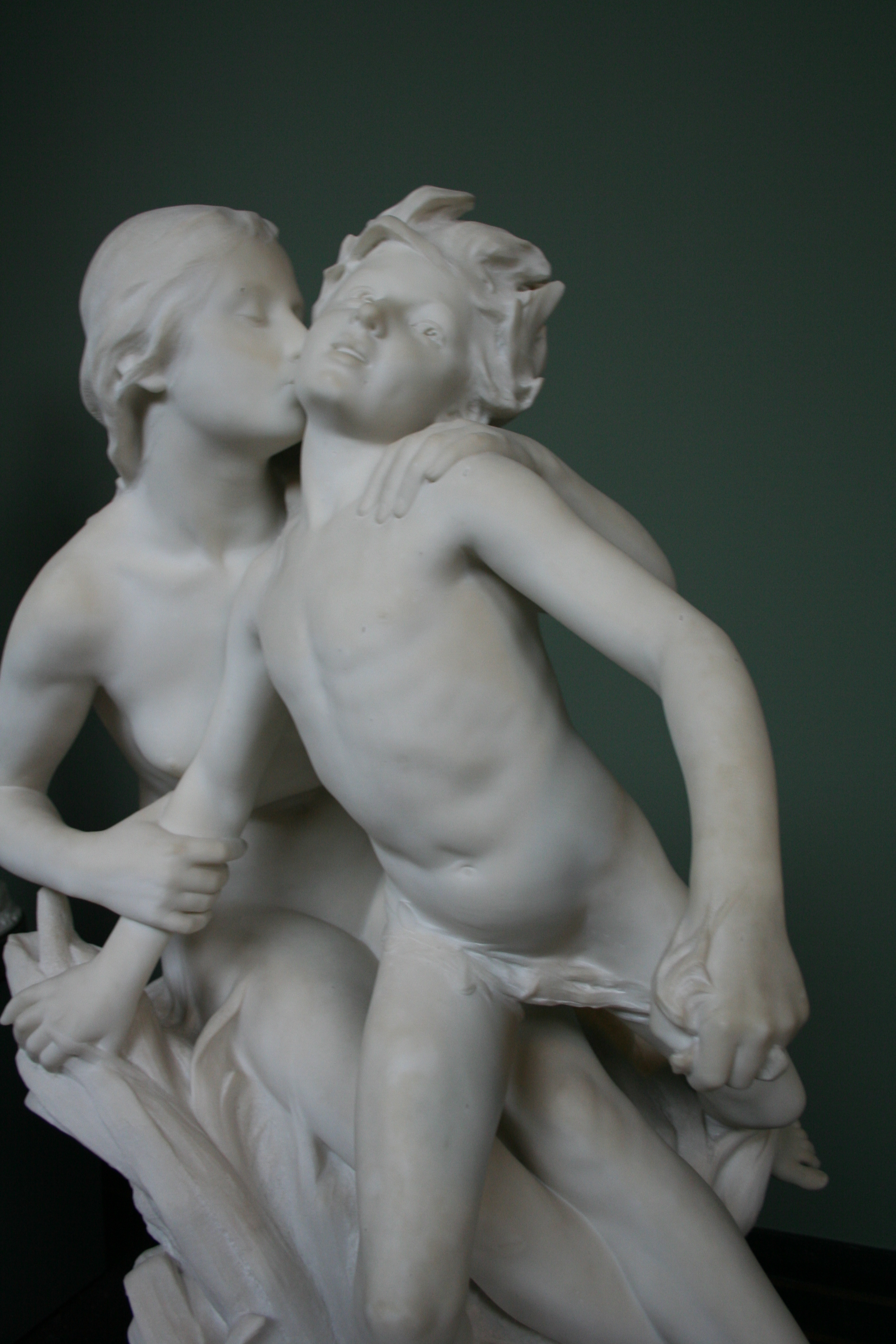
The Meadow and the Brook, Ny Carlsberg Glyptotek, Copenhagen.

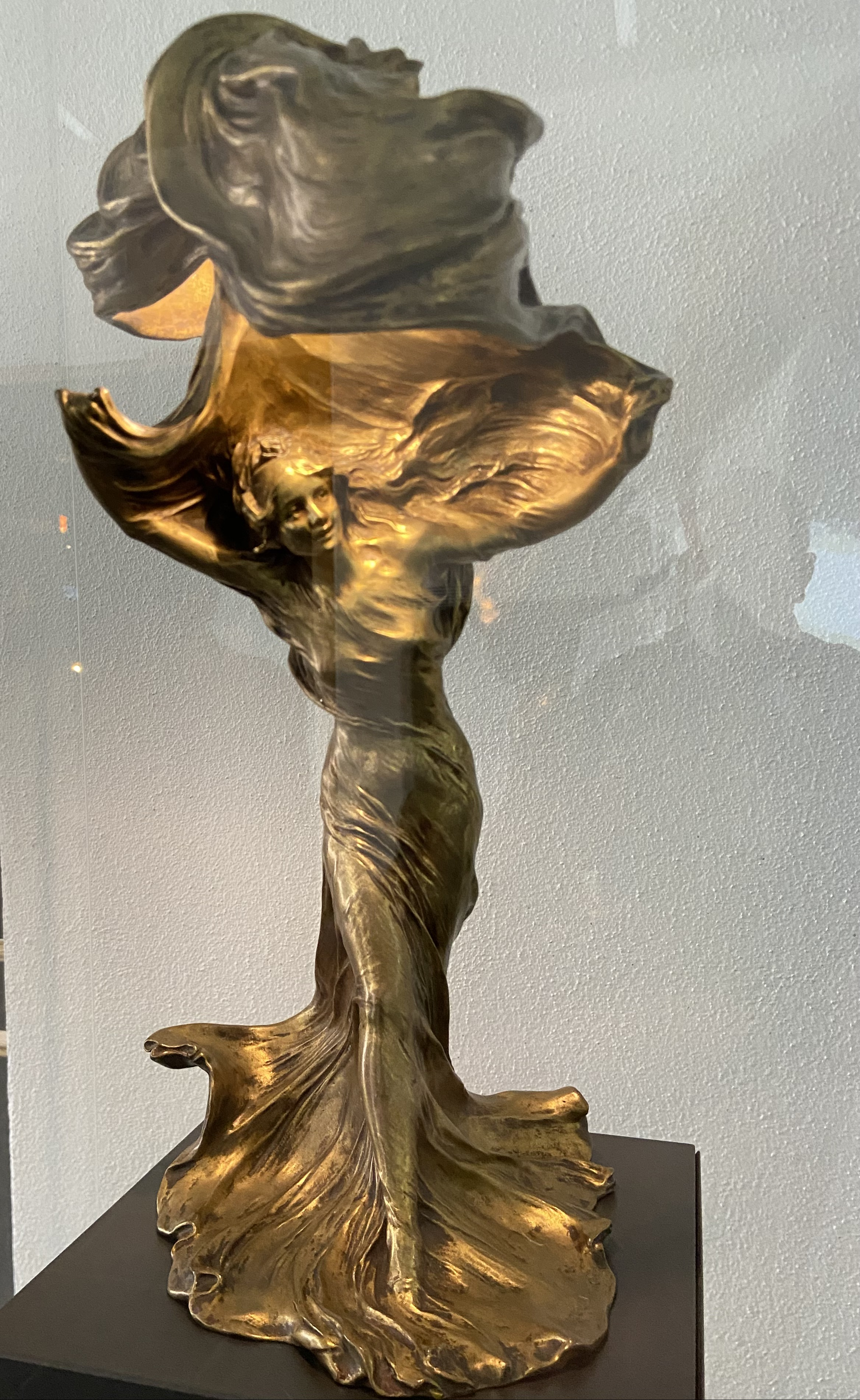
Table lamp: Dance of the Lily (Loie Fuller) - around 1901-Gilt bronze-Museum Wiesbaden-Raoul Larche (1860-1912)

François-Raoul Larche (1860 in Saint-André-de-Cubzac – 1912 in Paris) was a French Art Nouveau sculptor whose work included several figures of Christ, but who may be better known for his numerous female figures, both nude and draped.

He was one of several artists inspired by the dancer Loie Fuller; one of his best-known statues depicts Fuller dancing with part of her drapery billowing above and behind her head like a flame.

Another well-known sculpture, Les Violettes, depicts a group of nude children with an older girl who may be their mother or older sister. Their bodies are entwined with flower stems and leaves and they are all wearing petal bonnets, suggesting that they are meant to represent the spirits of flowers.
