= Chelique Sarabia =

Venezuelan musician (1940–2022)

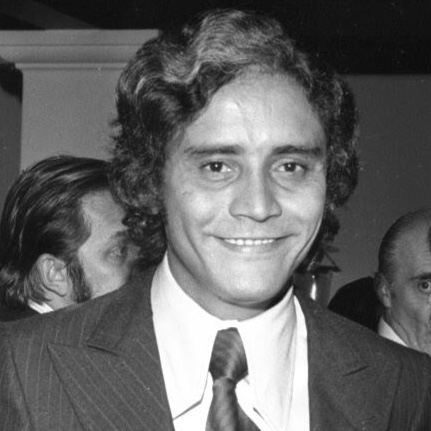
Chelique Sarabia in 1972

José Enrique “Chelique” Sarabia (13 March 1940 – 16 February 2022) was a Venezuelan poet, musician, publicist, and television producer. He wrote more than 1000 songs registered at the Society of Authors and Composers of Venezuela (SACVEN), also has been one of the most successful Venezuelan musicians of the 20th century, recognized universally for being the author of “Ansiedad” (1958), which was recorded by Nat King Cole and later covered by Viktor Lazlo for her compilation album Sweet, Soft N' Lazy. In addition, he is the author of songs that comprise the Venezuelan cultural heap such as "Cuando no sé de ti" (When I Don't Know About You), "Chinita de Maracaibo", "No te muerdas los labios", "Piragüero", "Ayúdame", "Te Necesito", "Mi Propio Yo", and "En este País".

== Career ==
Sarabia was born in La Asunción, Isla Margarita, Venezuela on 13 March 1940. In the 1960s, he became an independent musical producer, involving RCTV program Club Musical, where he discovered artists like José Luis Rodríguez, the sisters Rosa Virginia and María Teresa Chacín, "Los Impala", Las Aves Tronadoras, Henry Stephen and Cherry Navarro.

In 1971, he recorded an album of traditional and folkloric songs but giving them a modern touch, using specially developed equipment based on the principles of the Moog. Chelique employed traditional instruments like the cuatro and the bandola llanera, filtered these instruments through oscillators, playing with feedback, tape delay, synthesized frequencies, echoing sounds. The result was Revolución "Electrónica" en Música Venezolana. Originally, the album was sponsored by the Shell Company in Venezuela, given away to customers, employees, and friends of the company as a Christmas gift in 1973. It was titled 4 Fases del Cuatro - Música Venezolana desarrollada Electrónicamente por Chelique Sarabia (4 Phases of Four - Venezuelan Music Electronically Developed by Chelique Sarabia). Once the exclusivity period with the petrol company was over, Chelique did a commercial release, this time under the name of Revolución "Electrónica" en Música Venezolana (Electronic Revolution in Venezuelan Music). Thanks to this, Chelique and his team were considered electronic music pioneers in Latin America.

In 1973, he composed the song "El caminante", which became the anthem for the presidential campaign of Carlos Andrés Pérez and Acción Democrática. He died on 16 February 2022, at the age of 81.

== See also ==
- Music of Venezuela
