= Raymond Asso =

- Born: 2 June 1901; Nice, France
- Died: 24 October 1968 (aged 67) Paris, France
- Occupation: Lyricist

Raymond Asso (2 June 1901 – 24 October 1968) was a French lyricist.

== Early life ==
Born in Nice, France, his parents separation saw him leave for Morocco at the age of 15. After his arrival he tried numerous professions, including: shepherd, factory worker, chauffeur and nightclub manager. Between 1916 and 1919 he enlisted as a Spahi (a member of a North African cavalry regiment in the French army), being deployed in Turkey and Syria. After a lack of success and satisfaction with these occupations, he eventually turned to writing in 1933, working on his own lyrics and poetry.

== Career ==
=== Chanson ===
He began working in chanson but success eluded him until he met Édith Piaf in 1935. The French chanteuse became his lover and muse. Asso's writing became focused on providing lyrics for his new partner, penning numerous lyrics inspired by her. Asso became more than a partner to Piaf, acting as her mentor and teaching her how to dress and write well. This liberated her from the scandal involving the murder of her manager, Louis Leplée. Asso's songs from this era were put to the music of Marguerite Monnot, who became the regular composer for la Môme. During this period, Asso also wrote songs for Marie Dubas including "Le Fanion de la Légion" ("The Legion's Flag") and "Mon légionnaire" ("My Legionnaire").

=== Post-Piaf ===
In August 1939, Asso was called up to the French army due to World War II and his collaborations with Piaf were brought to an end. Asso was succeeded by Paul Meurisse as Piaf's wordsmith. After his service in the war Asso went on to write lyrics for other artists including Lucienne Delyle, Marcel Mouloudji and Renée Lebas. The 1950s were a prolific period for the writer and he also found commercial success with songs such as "Y’a tant d’amour" (sung by Renée Lebas) and "Un petit coquelicot" which was written for Marcel Mouloudji. Asso wrote songs for many of the French stars of the era:

- Yves Montand ("Ninon, ma ninette")
- Catherine Sauvage ("Berceuse pour demain", "Mon coeur battait", "Mon ami m’a donné", "Mais les vrais amoureux")
- Jean Bretonnière ("C’est tant pis, c’est tant mieux")
- Odette Laure ("Je suis nerveuse")
- Tino Rossi ("Mon printemps", "O ma mie o ma Mireille")
- André Dassary ("Des pays merveilleux")

In addition to his work as a chanson lyricist, Asso also recorded some albums of musical stories for children such as La légende du Père-Noël (The Legend of Father Christmas). Towards the end of his life Asso moved away from writing lyrics and between 1962 and 1968 he was administrator of the Société des auteurs, compositeurs et éditeurs de musique (SACEM). He died in 1968.

== Bibliography and discography ==
- Évangiles, Asso, Raymond - artwork by Jean Boullet, Paris, Éditions du Trois-Mâts (1947)
- Le Sixième évangile, Asso, Raymond, C. R. Denoel, Paris (1950)
- Récréation, Asso, Raymond, Paris, Nouvelles éditions Méridian (1952)
- Silhouettes (1952)
- Chansons d'hier et d'aujourd'hui (Songs of Yesterday and Today) (1953)
- Le joli Noël du petit ressort de montre (Merry Christmas of the Watch Spring) (1959)
- La légende du Père-Noël - conte : Livre-disque, Written by: Asso; Told by: Asso, Pierre Larquey; Music by Claude Valéry, France Adès; Released by Le Petit ménestrel (1965)

== Works ==
- "Mon amant de la Coloniale" (1936)
- "Mon légionnaire" (1937)
- "Un jeune homme chantait" (1937)
- "J'entends la sirène" (1937)
- "Le Chacal" (1937)
- "Le contrebandier" (1937)
- "Le mauvais matelot" (1937)
- "Partance" (1937)
- "Tout fout l'camp (1937)
- "Le Fanion de la Légion" (1938)
- "Paris-Méditerranée" (1938)
- "C’est lui que mon cœur a choisi (avec Paul Colline)" (1938)
- "Le grand voyage du pauvre nègre" (1938)
- "Les marins ça fait des voyages" (1938)
- "Madeleine qu'avait du coeur" (1938)
- "Elle fréquentait la rue Pigalle" (1939)
- "Je n’en connais pas la fin" (1939)
- "Le petit monsieur triste" (1939)
- "Les deux copains"
- "Browning"
- "On danse sur ma chanson" (1940)
- "C’est l’histoire de Jésus"
- "La java du bonheur du monde"
- "Y’a tant d’amour" (1950)
- "Comme un petit coquelicot" (1952)
- "Ninon, ma ninette" (1954)
- "C’est tant pis, c’est tant mieux" (1954)
- "Berceuse pour demain" (1955)
- "Je suis nerveuse" (1955)
- "Mon cœur battait" (1956)
- "Mon printemps" (1956)
- "Mon ami m’a donné"
- "Mais les vrais amoureux"
- "O ma mie o ma Mireille"
- "Des pays merveilleux"
- "Un petit bouquet de violettes"
- "La chanson du Marsupilami" (1960)
- "Si les tambours" (1963)
