= Marguerite Monnot =

French composer (1903–1961)

Background information
- Born: 28 May 1903; Decize, Nièvre
- Died: 12 October 1961 (aged 58) Paris, France
- Occupations: Songwriter; composer

Marguerite Monnot (English: /mɒˈnoʊ/ mo-NOH, French: [maʁɡəʁit mɔnɔ]; 28 May 1903 – 12 October 1961), was a French songwriter and composer best known for having written many of the songs performed by Édith Piaf ("Milord", "Hymne à l'amour") and the music for the stage musical Irma La Douce.

== Career ==
She was classically trained by her father and at the Paris Conservatory (her teachers included Nadia Boulanger, Vincent d’Indy, and Alfred Cortot). Monnot made the unusual switch to composing popular music after poor health ended her career as a concert pianist at the age of eighteen. Soon after, she wrote her first commercially successful song, "L'Étranger". In 1935, she met Édith Piaf, and in 1940, they became a female songwriting team, remaining friends and collaborators throughout most of their lives.

Monnot worked with lyricists such as Raymond Asso, Henri Contet, Georges Moustaki, and collaborated with musicians and writers including Charles Aznavour, Yves Montand, Boris Vian, and Marlene Dietrich, who gathered in Piaf's living room regularly to play and sing. In 1955, she achieved major success with her setting of Alexandre Breffort's book, Irma la Douce, which was translated into English and had long runs in London and on Broadway under the direction of Peter Brook.

== Early years ==
Marguerite Monnot was born in Decize, Nièvre, a small city on the river Loire. Her father, Gabriel Monnot, who had lost his sight at the age of three, was a musician and composer of religious music. He was the organist at the Saint-Aré church in Decize and gave piano and harmonium lessons. Monnot's mother, Marie, also gave music lessons and was a teacher of French literature and a writer. Every evening, pupils and friends gathered in their home to play and sing, and the Monnots sometimes invited well-known musicians to join them. She rarely attended school; her mother taught her at home and she practiced piano several hours a day.

At the age of three, she composed her first little song, "Bluette". At three and a half, she accompanied a singer at a Paris performance of a Mozart berceuse, receiving a toy stuffed cat as compensation. In 1911, at the Salle des Agriculteurs in Paris, she played Liszt, Chopin, and Mozart, and received her first press reviews. From twelve to fifteen years of age, she performed in several different cities, including Paris, where Camille Saint-Saëns is said to have remarked of her, "I have just heard the best pianist in the world." At age fifteen, she was sent to study in Paris. She had lessons from Vincent d’Indy in harmony and fugue, studied piano with Alfred Cortot and American pianist Harold Henry, and learned harmony from Nadia Boulanger. The latter helped her to prepare for the Prix de Rome, although it is unclear whether she actually entered the competition formally. She toured the capitals of Europe when she was sixteen, and accompanied the dancer Vincente Escuderro in Madrid. There, she became interested in Spanish folklore. She was offered the opportunity to become an official musician at the Spanish royal court, but her parents sent her back to Paris instead for further study.

Her concert career was interrupted in 1921, on the eve of a United States tour, by a bout of ill health and what the French call "le trac", or an attack of nerves. She became noticeably shy when she had to show Piaf a new song, even after years of collaboration.

Her second vocation, songwriting, was just a pastime at first. A fan of popular music on the radio in the early 1920s, including jazz and dance music, she began writing songs because a family friend encouraged her to write a waltz for a film based on a play by Tristan Bernard. This song, written with Bernard in 1931, was entitled "Ah! les mots d’amour!" and sung by Jane Marny. Lyricist Marc Hély then asked her to compose the music for "Viens dans mes bras", sung by Lucienne Boyer and published by Salabert. She was encouraged to continue. She persevered, and in 1935, the song "L’Étranger" was born out of her collaboration with the journalist-lyricist Robert Malleron and the accordionist-composer Robert Juel, who co-authored the music. The song was awarded the Grand Prix de l'Académie Charles Cros that year.

== Piaf years ==
"L'Étranger" played a key role in Monnot's first encounter with Édith Piaf in 1936. Annette Lajon had sung the song originally, and Piaf wanted to acquire the rights to perform it. The publisher, Maurice Decruck, denied her request, however, because a singer had exclusive rights to a song for a six-month period, Piaf learned it and sang it at Le Gerny's, the nightclub where she was performing at the time. When Annette Lajon appeared in the audience at Le Gerny's one night, Piaf is said to have apologized to her for "stealing" her song. Lajon apparently accepted the apology and introduced Piaf to its composer, Marguerite Monnot, who had accompanied her to the nightclub.

The same year, Monnot met the lyricist Raymond Asso. He was a former Foreign Legionnaire, and he cut a romantic and exotic figure with his cape and boots. The first of Asso's songs for which Monnot wrote the music was "Mon légionnaire". Some years later, during a trip to Sidi Bel Abbes, Algeria, Monnot and Asso were awarded decorations by the Foreign Legion.

Monnot and Piaf became close friends and began collaborating on songs in the early 1940s. Their songs were performed by Piaf, and many famous female singers at the time, including Damia, Mona Goya, and Line Viala. These include the songs from the film Montmartre-sur-Seine ("Tu es partout", "Un coin tout bleu", "Y’en a un de trop", "Où sont-ils mes petits copains?"), "Mon amour vient de finir" (Damia), and "C’était un jour de fête." Monnot devoted the next twenty-five years writing songs for Piaf.

In her biography, Piaf calls Monnot her best friend and the woman she most admired in the whole world. She also refers to her pride in having collaborated with Monnot. Piaf paid tribute to Monnot for encouraging her interest in classical music and in learning to play the piano. During the war years, from 1939 to 1945, Monnot collaborated with Henri Contet, writing such songs as "Y’a pas de printemps", "Histoire de coeur", "Le ciel est fermé", and "Le brun et le blond". They also worked together on the songs for the film Etoile sans lumière, for Piaf, and "Ma môme, ma p’tite môme [or gosse]" for Yves Montand.

In those years, Piaf rehearsed a few songs by Monnot that were never recorded, including "Le chant du monde" (lyric by Asso), "Mon amour vient de finir", "Les rues du monde" and "Le diable est près de moi" (lyrics by Piaf), and "L’hôtel d’en face" (lyric by Gine Money). This was also the period when Piaf recorded a number of songs which were never released, such as "Je ne veux plus faire la vaisselle" ("I Don’t Want To Wash Dishes Anymore").

During Piaf's tour of the stalags in Germany during the war, one of the famous Monnot-Asso songs, "Le fanion de la Légion", was banned because it had supposedly created a patriotic fervor in Parisian audiences. Meanwhile, Monnot remained in Paris, making occasional trips home to Decize to see her mother (her father had died in 1939) and bring provisions from the countryside back to Paris.

On 11 July 1950, Monnot married the singer Étienne Giannesini, whose stage name was Paul Péri. The couple had no children. They reportedly made many trips to Decize to visit Monnot's mother, and Monnot wrote songs for Péri, including the music for a detective film, "Les Pépées font la loi", in which Péri starred in 1954.

In the 1950s, Monnot also collaborated with a few new lyricists, including Michel Emer, Luiguy, Norbert Glanzberg, Philippe-Gérard, Florence Véran, and Hubert Giraud, and with the orchestra of Robert Chauvigny. She continued to write for Piaf with another songwriter, René Rouzaud, who had already composed for Damia, Georges Guétary, and Lys Gauty. They wrote the popular "La goualante du pauvre Jean" ("Poor John's Song/Complaint") – translated as "The Poor People of Paris" due to confusion between "pauvre Jean" and "pauvre gens" – which became the first French song to hit number one on the American and British record charts.

== Irma La Douce and beyond ==
Irma La Douce was opened on 12 November 1956, at the Théâtre Gramont in Paris, where it ran for four years. The book and lyrics were by Alexandre Breffort; it was directed by René Dupuy and starred Colette Renard and Michel Roux. A year and a half into the Paris run, the show opened in London. It was directed by Peter Brook and starred Elizabeth Seal and Keith Michell. Eventually, the English-language Irma went on to become more popular than the original French one. The musical opened on 17 July 1958, at the Lyric Theatre in London's West End, where it ran for 1,512 performances. The show opened in New York on Broadway at the Plymouth Theater on 29 September 1960, and ran for 524 performances.

It played simultaneously in France, the UK, the US, Canada, South Africa, Australia, Germany, Spain, Sweden, Denmark, Italy, the Netherlands, Belgium, Brazil and Argentina. It was recorded under the Sony label and starred Elizabeth Seal and Keith Michell, who had both been part of the London cast.

In 1963, Billy Wilder directed the movie version, starring Shirley MacLaine and Jack Lemmon. The film's opening credits say, "Based on the Play by Alexandre Breffort and the Music by Marguerite Monnot." Andre Previn won the Academy Award for Scoring of Music — Adaptation or Treatment, and thanked Wilder, writer I. A. L. Diamond, the orchestra, and the academy, failing to acknowledge Monnot.

Shortly after the success of Irma, Disney Studios reportedly asked Monnot to come to Hollywood and compose for American films, but she refused to leave her settled life in France. From then, she collaborated regularly with Marcel Blistène, including writing some songs for the film Les amants de demain in 1959. (She had already worked with him on the film Etoile sans lumière in 1946.) She composed other songs for Péri, a singer of "realistic" songs, such as "Encore un verre" and "Ma rue et moi". She also composed the music for Méphisto and Le sentier de la guerre, written by Claude Nougaro.

Her songs were also sung by singers such as, Damia, Josephine Baker, Suzy Solidor, and Yves Montand.

These songs were a synthesis between the first years of the Monnot–Piaf collaboration and the post-war song, between the time of the legionnaires and the end of the dream of colonialism. In 1957, Monnot met the lyricist Michel Rivgauche, with whom she was to write "Salle d’attente", "Fais comme si", "Tant qu’il y aura des jours" and "Les blouses blanches", at Piaf's apartment . In 1959, Edith Piaf recorded Milord, which became an international hit.

As many of Piaf's biographers wrote, the friendship between the singer and Monnot 'suffered a serious setback' after Piaf met the composer Charles Dumont in the late 1950s. Dumont composed Piaf's significant signature tune, "Je ne regrette rien", whereupon Piaf took 11 of Monnot's songs out of her repertoire for her upcoming performance at the Olympia to make room for more Dumont songs.

Monnot became ill with symptoms of appendicitis during her last year of life, 1961. She seems to have had a premonition that her illness was life-threatening, yet she failed to follow medical advice and have the operation. She wrote to her friend, Madame Niaudet:

It means nothing to get old, if you are always surrounded by your loved ones. But how horrible it is to be alone most of the time. I have a tremendous need for rest, especially mentally and emotionally. How terrible it is to have been born too sensitive! Will I soon find the calm I so badly need? There are times when I just despair. Alone in my room, the radio! All those notes! All those minutes, at the end of which lies death and, before the final end, the death of the heart, the love life. It's dreadful, this emptiness inside me.

On 12 October 1961, at the age of 58, Marguerite Monnot died in a Paris hospital from a ruptured appendix and the resulting peritonitis. She was buried with her father and mother in the cemetery of her hometown. Piaf – who used to call her "La Guite" – as well as Monnot's many friends and colleagues paid tribute to her. In 1963, the city of Decize renamed the street where she had lived (rue des Écoles) "rue Marguerite Monnot". It also unveiled a commemorative plaque on the façade of Decize.

In 1989, the nursery school in the center of town was also named after her. In 1991, on the thirtieth anniversary of her death, a mass, concert, and exhibition were held in Decize in her memory. Her true memorial is to be found in her œuvre.
