= Jean Boullet =

French painter (1921–1970)

Jean Boullet (December 12, 1921-November 2, 1970) is a French painter, draftsman, illustrator, film critic and writer.

== Biography ==
Jean Boullet was the son of a cat fur trader on the Avenue d'Italie, Henri Boullet, who committed suicide by hanging. In his catholic childhood, he spent his summers in Isdes, in a house he would keep. He began to paint in 1942, mainly portraits. He made a name for himself as a draftsman and illustrator in Saint-Germain-des-Prés immediately after the war. He illustrated both a book by Daniel-Rops, the Catholic writer (This face that looks at us), and the sulphurous work - banned by censorship - by Boris Vian, I will go to spit on your graves, texts of Edgar Poe, Raymond Asso, poems by Villon, Verlaine. In 1948, he was the author of the sets for the play J'irai cracher sur vos graves which Boris Vian took from his homonymous novel and which he signed with his real name.

Jean Boullet is also a film critic who venerates the fantastic and horror films that can be seen at the Midi-Minuit cinema on the Grands Boulevards. To show the even rarer films that he loves, he set up a private film club in his house on rue Bobillot: the Société des Amis de Bram Stoker. He will also be with Michel Caen, Alain Le Bris and Jean-Claude Romer, the co-founder of the film review Midi Minuit Fantastique (1962-1971). This magazine was published by Éric Losfeld. Midi Minuit Fantastique was dedicated to fantasy, horror and science fiction films. Jean Boullet retired from writing in 1966.

Some of her traits seem to show aspects of libertarianism, Jean Boullet is also has an interest many other themes cuach sexology, illusionism, magic, demonology and popular mythology. In December 1965, he opened a bookshop, Le Kiosque, at 79, rue du Château, specializing in these themes and in collectible comics. Later crippled with debts, he closed shop at the beginning of 1969, and in August, he moved to Ouargla, Algeria to run a bookstore there.

On several occasions, he travelled to the Maghreb, notably to Algeria, Morocco, and Mauritania, but also to Senegal and Sudan, from where he brought back many drawings.

During the summer of 1970, he left Ouargla for the south and undertook a trip while keeping his bookstore. During one of the stages of this trip, at the end of December, he was discovered in Tébessa, south of Constantine, according to the Algerian police report, hanging from a tree. In the book, Jean Boullet: Le Précurseur” by Denis Chollet, published in 1999, it is not known whether it was murder, suicide or a sexual thing that had gotten out of control. According to the writer Roger Peyrefitte, Jean Boullet was stabbed to death.

Guy Loudmer, Hervé Poulain, and Pierre Cornette de Saint Cyr dispersed his workshop in Paris on April 23, 1971.

== Homoeroticism ==
Openly homosexual, proclaiming himself "painter of male beauty", he multiplied the drawings or paintings of a homoerotic aesthetic somewhat inspired by that of Jean Cocteau.

Jean Boullet, during his life, met the Tout-Paris whose names were then: Édith Piaf, Michel Déon, Marie-Laure de Noailles, Jean Cocteau, Juliette Gréco, Jacques Chazot, Piéral (from 1942), Sacha Guitry, Marcel Carné, Roland Lesaffre, Kenneth Anger, Félix Labisse, Lise Deharme, Michel Laclos, Elliott Stein, Jacques Courtois.

He was also a friend of Max Jacob. A portrait in Indian ink made by him in 1943 representing the Breton poet wearing the yellow star is now preserved and presented at the Museum of Fine Arts in Quimper.
