= Stefan Waggershausen =

German singer, composer, and songwriter (born 1949)

Stefan Waggershausen (born 20 February 1949) is a German singer, composer, and songwriter.

Waggershausen was born in Friedrichshafen, at Lake Constance. In 1974 he produced his first record as singer. In 1980, he had his first big success with the song "Hallo Engel". Further songs were released, partly sung together with Ofra Haza and María Conchita Alonso. The biggest commercial success of Waggershausen's career were the 1984 duet "Zu nah am Feuer" with Italian singer-songwriter Alice and the 1990 duet Das erste Mal tat's noch weh with Viktor Lazlo.

== Discography ==
- Traumtanzzeit (1974)
- Hallo Engel (1980)
- Fang mich auf (1981)
- Sanfter Rebell (1982)
- Tabu (1984)
- Mitten ins Herz (1984, Live)
- Touché d'amour (1985)
- Im Herzen des Orkans (1987)
- Tief im Süden meines Herzens (1990)
- Herzsprünge (1991)
- Wenn dich die Mondfrau küßt (1993)
- Louisiana (1995)
- Die Rechnung kommt immer (1997)
- Wolke 7 (2000)
- Duette & Balladen (2003)
- Unterm Cajun-Mond (2004)
- Cassandra (2005)
- Der alte Wolf wird langsam grau (2010)
- Endloser Sommer (2010)
- Für Dich (2010)
- So ist das Spiel (2010)
- Windstärke 10 (2012)
- Ich kenn mich aus mit dem Blues (2018)
- Aus der Zeit gefallen (2019)
- Fliegen mit dem Zeppelin (2019)
- Hank Williams (2019)
- Mädchen der besonderen Art (2019)
- Sonntagskind (2019)
- Zu schön für mich (2020)
