= Paul-Léon Jazet =

French painter

Paul-Léon Jazet (13 June 1848 – 1918) was a French painter born in Paris, the son of the engraver Alexandre-Jean-Louis Jazet (1814–21 February 1897). For much of his career, he was mostly known for genre scenes, portraits and military subjects.

== Career ==
After a pupillage with Félix-Joseph Barrias his career developed successfully and he became a regular exhibitor at the Paris Salon. The influence of the Franco-Prussian War is reflected in his many paintings with military subjects. These and his other works were often copied and marketed as photographs and prints by the prominent Paris-based art dealer Goupil & Cie.

Paul-Léon Jazet made his debut in the Paris Salon in 1869, becoming a member in 1886.. The following are the titles of paintings he exhibited at the Salon during 1869–1881. Some English translations have been indicated where they are likely to be appropriate to the subject of an unseen painting. As a result of the Franco-Prussian War there was no Salon in 1871.

1869
Portrait de M.A. de B.....
Un Message
1870
Avant la Déclaration
Indiscrétion
1872
Repaire/ Lair or den of criminals
1873
Une Affaire d'Honneur
1874
Franc-tireurs dans la forêt de Fontainebleau/ Franc-tireurs in the forest of Fontainebleau
1875
Une Facheuse Aventure
1876
The Bivouac
1877
Play of Princes, illustration of XV111th Century Manners
1878
Après le Baptême/After the Baptism
Une Mésalliance/An Unsuitable marriage
1879

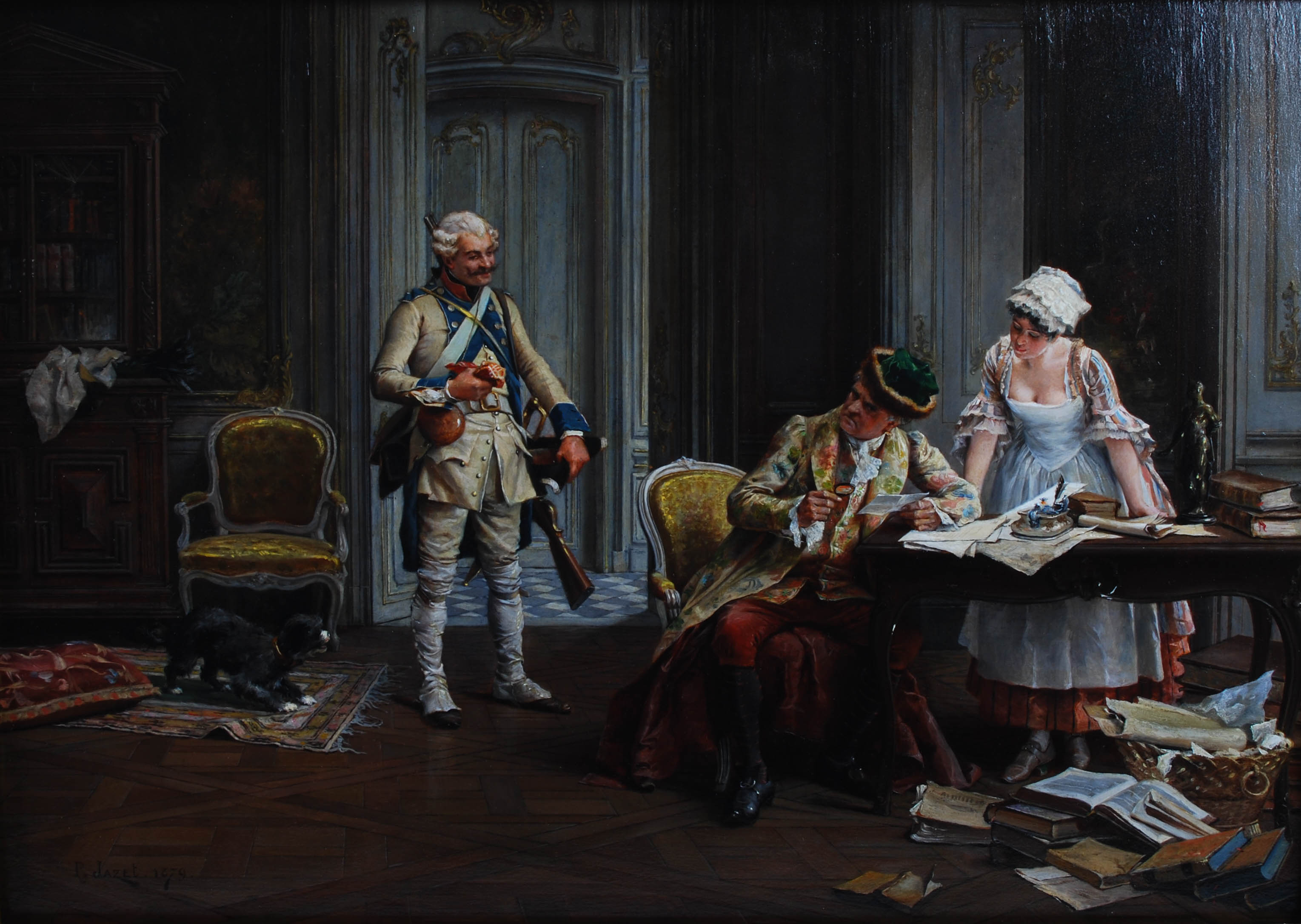
Le Billet de Logement. Oil on panel, signed and dated P Jazet 1879.

:Le Fils Unique/Entre Deux Victoires (name change in later printed versions)

Billet de Logement/Letter of Lodging
1880
Departure of the Squadron
1881
Le Boute-selle/Call to Horse
Aux Avant-poste/The Advance Guard

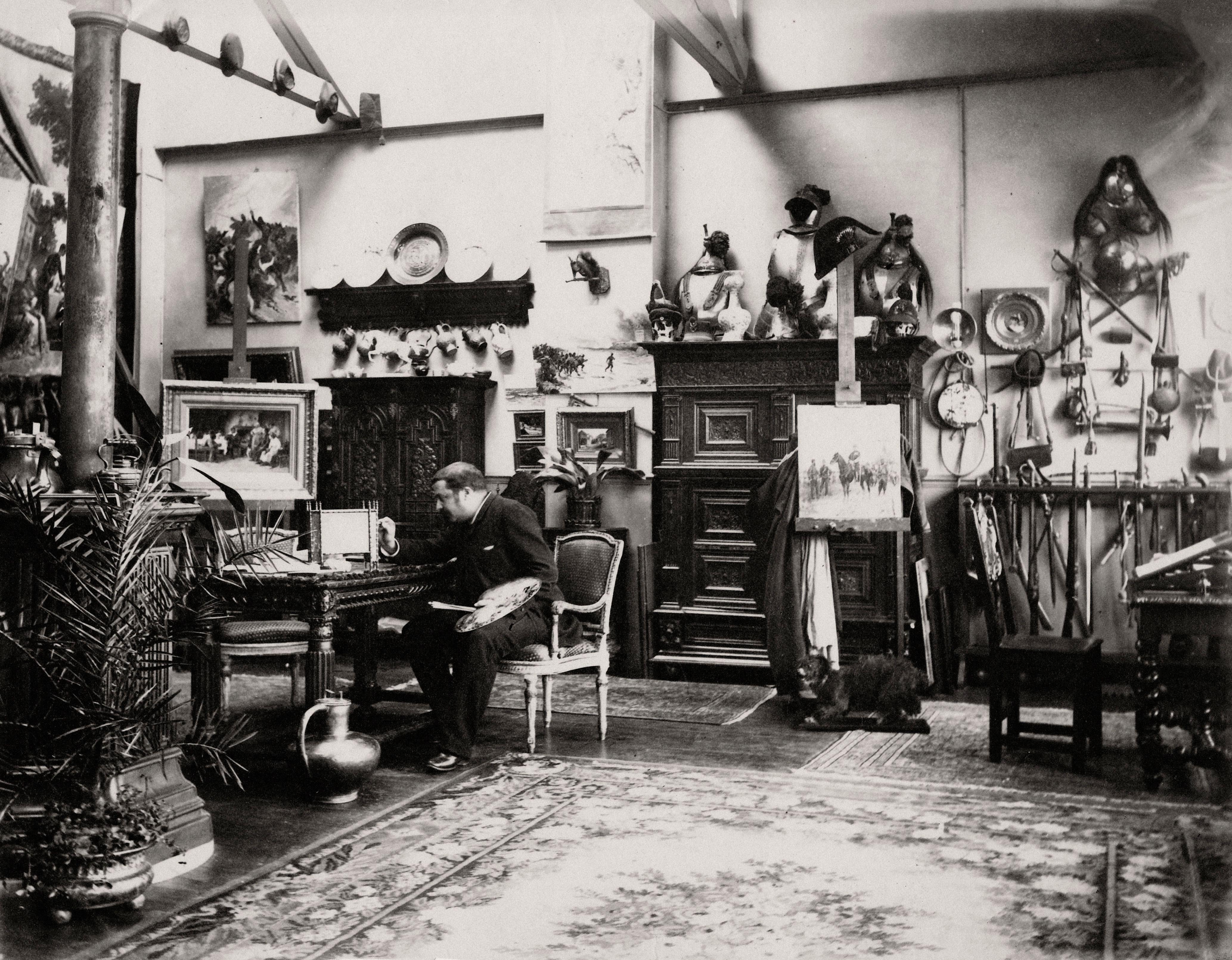
Paul-Léon Jazet in his Paris studio (c1885).

Jazet was always based in Paris, and around 1885 his studio was photographed by Edmond Bénard. A possible studio address at this time is 2 Rue Aumont-Thiéville. This is included in the 1885 Salon entry recording that Jazet exhibited a painting titled Trop Novice. Alternatively, this entry also suggests that the rather fine looking studio could have been provided at 9 Rue Chaptal by Boussod, Valedon & Cie the successors to Goupil & Cie. It is interesting to note that the dog seen in the 1879 painting Le Billet de Logement was a prop kept in the studio.

The highest recent auction price for one of Jazet's oil paintings was for The Death of Lord Nelson, measuring 41¾ x 61¾ in. (106 x 156.8 cm.) and dated 1882. It achieved $137,000 (hammer plus buyers' premium) at Christie's New York on 27 October 2014.

Paul-Léon Jazet also illustrated books. One was about the famous French military training school titled Histoire de l'École spéciale militaire de Saint-Cyr par un ancien saint-cyrien (History of the military academy of Saint-Cyr by an old saint-cyrien). This was first published in 1886 and contained 52 full-page black and white prints by Jazet. Paperback versions are still produced today. Similarly, in 1889, Jazet provided 40 illustrations for a book on French naval training history. An example of a non-military book for which he provided illustrations is the 1891 edition of La Confession D'Un Enfant Du Siècle (The Confession of a Child of the Century) by Alfred de Musset. This contained 10 drawings by Jazet.

It is suggested that later in his career Jazet broadened his interests, and that the art work attributed to his father Alexandre-Jean-Louis Jazet, produced during the late Belle Époque and the Art Nouveau periods and signed by the pseudonym 'Japhet', was in fact produced by Paul-Léon Jazet. Such work included fans, postcards, posters and costume design for comic opera and theatre. This included costume designs for the famous dancer and actress Loïe Fuller whose swirling silk costumes and theme dresses, such as a dress strongly inspired by a butterfly, exemplified the new approach expressing organic forms characteristic of the Art Nouveau period.
