= Marie Dubas =

French music-hall singer, diseuse and comedian

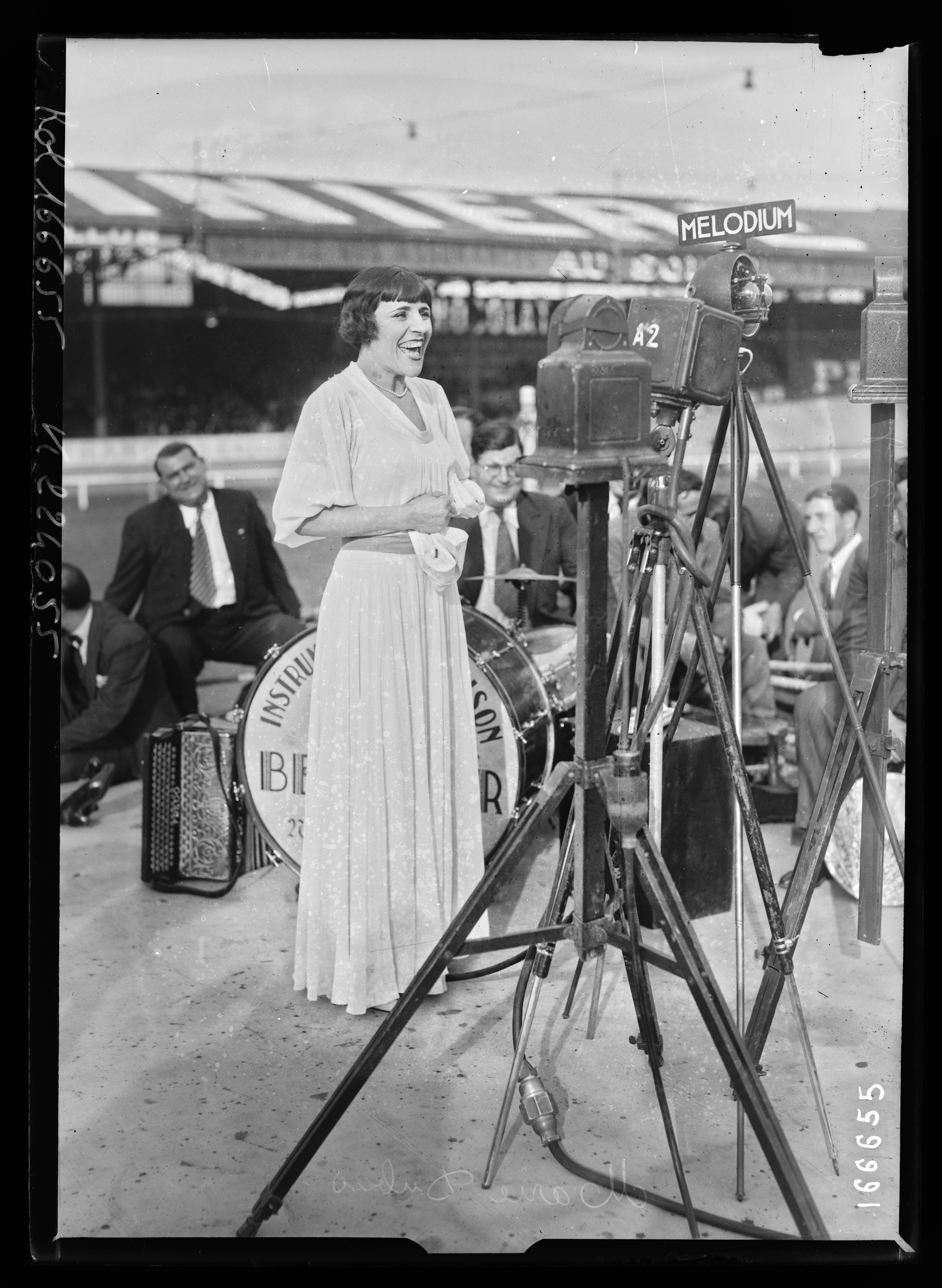

Background information
- Born: 3 September 1894; Paris, France
- Died: 21 February 1972 (aged 77) Paris
- Occupations: Singer and actress

Marie Dubas (3 September 1894 – 21 February 1972) was a French music-hall singer, diseuse and comedian.

== Biography ==
Born in Paris to Polish Jewish immigrants, Marie Dubas began her career as a stage actress but became famous as a singer. Using the great Yvette Guilbert as her model, Dubas started singing in the small cabarets of Montmartre mixing comedy into her routine. She earned a following that led to offers to perform in Parisian operettas and musicals and during the 1920s and 1930s, starred at such places as the Casino de Paris and Bobino, the great music hall in Montparnasse. Her most famous song, Mon légionnaire, was written by Raymond Asso and recorded in 1936. Her popularity became such that in 1939 she toured the United States.

The occupation of France by the Germans during World War II proved a difficult time for the Dubas. Although married to a French gentile who served in the Air Force, she was nevertheless banned by the Vichy government and placed under house arrest by the Gestapo who raided her Paris apartment. Forced to flee the country, Dubas took refuge in Lausanne, Switzerland where she remained until the end of the war. On her return to France, she learned her sister had been executed and her nephew had been shipped to a concentration camp, never to be heard from again.

The inspiration for Édith Piaf, Marie Dubas returned to performing and in 1954 was chosen as a headliner for the reopening of the Paris Olympia. A stage production about her life, Dubas de haut, en bas, was created by Opéra Éclaté.

Dubas retired in 1958. She died in Paris in 1972 and is interred there in the Père Lachaise Cemetery.
