= She (Viktor Lazlo album) =

Studio album by Viktor Lazlo
- Released: 1985
- Genres: Pop, Pop jazz
- Labels: Polydor, PolyGram
- Producer: J.P. Hawks

Viktor Lazlo chronology
She (1985)	Viktor Lazlo (1987)

She is the first studio album by French-Belgian singer Viktor Lazlo.

The album consists of several original jazz pop compositions and includes two cover versions, the first one being Rita Hayworth's Put the Blame on Mame, and a French version of the Julie London song Cry Me a River, entitled Pleurer Des Rivieres. The song was successful on the French single charts peaking at No. 27.

Seven songs were eventually released as a single off the album: Backdoorman, Last Call For An Angel, Loser and Sweet, Soft'N'Lazy, which became successful but wasn't ranked on any chart. Another single, Canoë Rose, however, was successful in Belgium, peaking at No. 33 on the single charts, and in France, peaking at No. 14. The song Slow Motion was later added to the CD version of the album and released as a single too, but was not included on the original album.

The album was released as a Mini LP. It went on to sell over 100,000 copies in Germany and 60,000 in Japan.

Lazlo presented songs off this album on various TV shows, such as the single Loser on the Michael Schanze Show in September 1986.

== Track listing ==
No.	Title	Writer(s)	Length
1.	"She"	G. Cadiere	1:36
2.	"Sweet, Soft N' Lazy"	Cl. Bofane, G. Cadiere, V. Lazlo	5:20
3.	"Ain't Gonna Come"	Pierre Van Dormael, V. Lazlo	4:00
4.	"Stories"	Gillie Waddy, J. Walravens, V. Lazlo	4:40
5.	"Put the Blame on Mame"	Roberts Alan	2:47
6.	"I Don't Wanna Love Again"	Antioco, F. Philipo	4:17
7.	"Pleurer Des Rivieres"	Hamilton, B. Bergman	3:42
8.	"Last Call For An Angel"	Boris Bergman, Pierre Roger	3:36
9.	"Backdoorman"	A. Chamfort, B. Bergman	3:25
10.	"Loser"	P. Roger, V. Lazlo	3:30
11.	"Canoë Rose" (French version of Stories)	B. Bergman, J. Walravens	4:40
12.	"Slow Motion"	Verheyen, Vandenheuvel	4:22

== Charts ==
=== Album ===
Chart	Peak position
German Albums Chart	34
Swiss Albums Chart	27

=== Single releases ===
Year	Single	FR	BE
1985	Pleurer des rivières	27	—
1985	Canoë rose	14	33
