= Viktor Lazlo (album) =

Studio album by Viktor Lazlo
- Released: 1987
- Genre: Pop, Pop jazz
- Label: Polydor, PolyGram
- Producer: Lou Deprijck

Viktor Lazlo chronology
| She (1985) | Viktor Lazlo (1987) | Hot & Soul (1989) |

Viktor Lazlo is the self-titled second studio album by French-Belgian singer Viktor Lazlo.

Belgium was responsible to host the Eurovision Song Contest after Sandra Kim had won in 1986 with her song J'aime la vie. Lazlo was asked to host the event as she is fluent in several languages and thus her self-titled album became very successful all over Europe, entering the Top 20 album charts in Holland, Germany, Austria and Switzerland. It spent 19 weeks on the German album charts.

The first single off the album was Breathless, which was co-written by Lazlo herself and features backing vocals by James Ingram and Bunny DeBarge. An official video was shot for the song and she also performed it at the beginning of the Eurovision Song Contest in 1987. The song reached No. 7 on the Belgian single charts.

The songs Take Me and You Are My Man were also released as singles.

== Track listing ==
| No. | Title | Writer(s) | Length |
|---|---|---|---|
| 1. | "Breathless" | Phil Allaert, Viktor Lazlo | 3:38 |
| 2. | "You Are My Man" | Evert Verhees, Patricia Maessen | 3:28 |
| 3. | "Take Me" | David Gistelinck, Pierre Van Dormael | 5:21 |
| 4. | "Moonlight Parade" | Guybert Cadiere, Viktor Lazlo | 4:16 |
| 5. | "Hey Baby, Cool!" (with the Count Basie Orchestra) | David Gistelinck, Pierre Van Dormael | 3:33 |
| 6. | "The Wizard's Call" | Ralph Benatar, Viktor Lazlo | 4:22 |
| 7. | "Rendez-Vous" | Nicolas Fiszman, Viktor Lazlo | 4:20 |
| 8. | "In Your Arms" | Jan Meeuwis, Raphaël Schillebeeckx | 4:11 |
| 9. | "Peter" | Evert Verhees, Patricia Maessen | 4:35 |
| 10. | "Champagne And Wine" | Danny Delaet, Silver van Holme | 2:42 |

=== Bonus Tracks ===
The song Don't Say No, which was also the B-side for the single Breathless, is bonus track available on the CD version only. Another bonus track on the CD is called Miracles.

== Charts ==
=== Album ===
| Chart | Peak position |
|---|---|
| German Albums Chart | 20 |
| Swiss Albums Chart | 17 |
| Austrian Albums Chart | 16 |
| Dutch Albums Chart | 16 |

=== Single releases ===
| Year | Single | BE | NL |
|---|---|---|---|
| 1987 | Breathless | 7 | 33 |

== Certifications ==
| Region | Certification | Certified units/sales |
|---|---|---|
| Belgium (BRMA) | Gold | 25,000^{*} |
^{*} Sales figures based on certification alone.
