= Viktor Lazlo =

French-Belgian singer (born 1960)

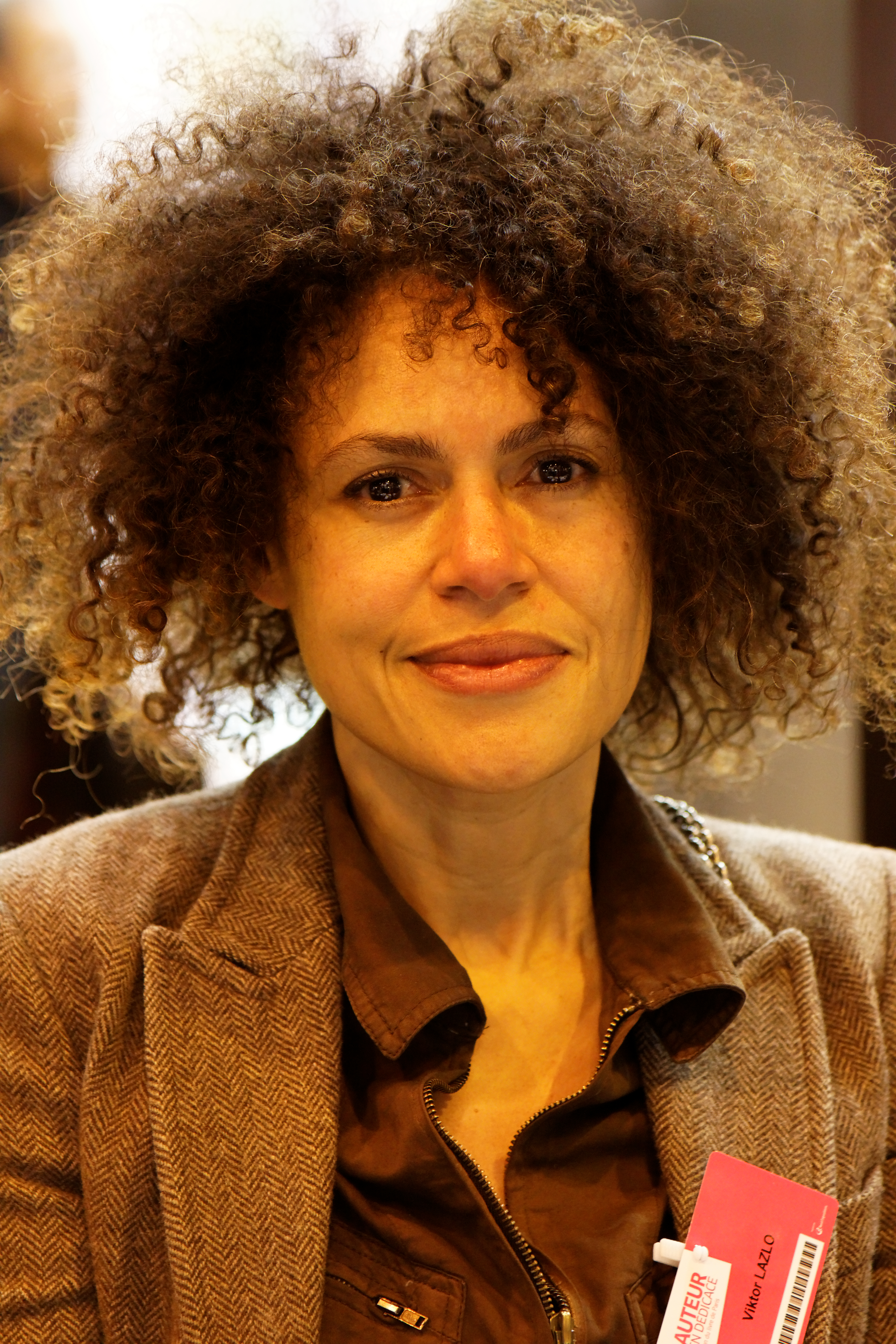
- Lazlo at the Paris Book Fair 2011
- Born: Sonia Dronnier; 7 October 1960 (age 65); Lorient, France
- Occupations: Singer; writer; comedian
- Website: www.viktorlazlo.net

Sonia Dronnier (born 7 October 1960), known by her stage name Viktor Lazlo, is a French writer, singer, and comedian.

Born in France, she studied in Belgium, where she is primarily known. Her biggest hit was "Breathless" in 1987. That year she also hosted the Eurovision Song Contest 1987 held in Brussels as well as several TV shows and literary events.

She has published six novels between 2010 and 2024, and has also written short stories.

Dronnier took her stage name from Paul Henreid's character Victor Laszlo in the 1942 film Casablanca, an escaped concentration camp prisoner trying to procure a visa so he can travel to America with his wife. She sings and acts in French, English, Spanish and German.

In October 2016, Lazlo announced the release of her new single "Promised Land". In February 2017, she released her new single "Lola & Jim" followed by new studio album Woman in October 2017.

== Discography ==
=== Albums ===
Most of her albums were released in an English/international and a French version. The discography lists both albums (naming the international version first). Also, numerous compilation albums have been released. The discography only lists those albums released by record companies to which she was signed at that point.

In 1987, a vocal clip of Lazlo announcing ‘Germany, ten points!’ at the Eurovision Song Contest was sampled in ‘Okay!’ by Okay!, a dance record that reached #1 in Austria and #2 in Germany.

- 1985 She / Canoë Rose
- 1987 Viktor Lazlo
- 1989 Hot & Soul / Club Desert
- 1990 Sweet, Soft N' Lazy (The Exclusive Collection) (official compilation album, incl. several new songs)
- 1991 My Delicious Poisons / Mes poisons délicieux
- 1993 Sweet, Soft & Lazy: The Very Best Of (the first official "best of"-album)
- 1996 Back to Front / Verso
- 2002 Loin de Paname (album of French chansons)
- 2002 Amour(s)
- 2004 Saga
- 2007 Begin The Biguine
- 2012 My Name is Billie Holiday
- 2017 Woman
- 2022 Suds

=== Singles ===
Single releases differed from country to country. The brackets indicate where the single was released. Int = international.

- 1984 "Backdoor Man" (int)
- 1985 "Canoë Rose" (France)
- 1985 "Last Call for an Angel" (Belgium)
- 1985 "Slow Motion" (int)
- 1986 "Pleurer des rivières" (France)
- 1986 "Sweet Soft & Lazy" (int)
- 1987 "Breathless" (int)
- 1987 "Take Me" (Germany)
- 1988 "You Are My Man" (int)
- 1988 "Amour Puissance Six" (int)
- 1989 "City Never Sleeps" (int)
- 1989 "In The Midnight Sky" (Germany)
- 1990 "Das Erste Mal Tat's Noch Weh" (duet with Stefan Waggershausen) (Germany)
- 1990 "Jesse" (duet with Stefan Waggershausen) (Germany)
- 1990 "Ansiedad" (int)
- 1991 "Baiser sacré" (duet with Xavier Deluc) (France)
- 1991 "Teach Me To Dance" (int)
- 1991 "Love Insane" (int)
- 1991 "Balade De Lisa" (France)
- 1993 "The Dream Is in Our Hands" (int)
- 1993 "Vattene amore" (duet with Amedeo Minghi) (Italy)
- 1994 "Engel Wie Du" (duet with Juliane Werding / Maggie Reilly) (Germany)
- 1996 "My Love" (int)
- 1996 "Turn It All Around" (int)
- 1998 "Besame Mucho" (duet with Raul Paz) (int)
- 1999 "Le message est pour toi" (duet with Biagio Antonacci) (int)
- 2002 "The Sound Of Expectation" (promo single from "Amour(s)")
- 2004 "Love To Love You Baby" (int)
- 2004 "Total Disguise" (duet with Serhat) (English)
- 2007 "J'attends" (promo single from "Begin The Biguine")
- 2016 "Promised Land"
- 2017 "Lola & Jim"
- 2017 "Debout"
- 2022 "Ouvre"

== Charts ==
=== Albums ===
Year	Album	D	CH	AUT	NL	FR	BE
1985	She	34	27	—	—	—	—
1987	Viktor Lazlo	20	17	16	11	—	—
1989	Hot & Soul	22	22	—	30	—	—
1991	Sweet, Soft N' Lazy (The Exclusive Collection)	—	—	—	63	—	—
1991	My Delicious Poisons	—	—	—	71	—	—
2002	Loin de Paname	—	—	—	—	67	—
2017	Woman	—	—	—	—	—	157

=== Singles ===
Year	Single	D	FR	CH	AUT	BE	NL
1985	Pleurer des rivières	—	27	—	—	—	—
1985	Canoë rose	—	14	—	—	33	—
1987	Breathless	—	—	—	—	7	33
1989	City Never Sleeps	—	—	—	—	—	53
1990	Das erste mal tat's noch weh	6	—	17	3	—	—
1990	Ansiedad	56	—	—	—	18	—
1991	Jesse (Douce Et Innocente)	25	—	—	—	—	—
1993	Engel wie du	—	—	—	—	14	25
1999	It's A Message For You	—	—	—	—	7	—
2017	Promised Land	—	—	—	—	Tip	—
2017	Debout	—	—	—	—	Tip	—

== Bibliography ==
- La femme qui pleure. Romans Français (in French). Paris: Albin Michel. 2010. ISBN 978-2-226-19583-8. - Présentation du livre et interview
- My name is Billie Holiday, Albin Michel, 2012 ISBN 978-2-226-24424-6
- Les Tremblements essentiels, Albin Michel, 2015 - Présentation du livre
- Les Passagers du siècle, Grasset, 2018,
- Trafiquants de colères, Grasset, 2020,
- Ce qui est pour toi, la rivière ne l'emporte pas, Robert Laffont, 2024

== Ouvrages collectifs ==
- L'almanach insolite, Editions Mine de Rien, 2018
- Voix d'écrivaines francophones - Anthologie du Parlement des Écrivaines Francophones, 2019
- Nouvelles de Martinique, Magellan, 2021
- Corps de fille, corps de femme, Des femmes-Antoinette Fouque, 2023
- 125 et des milliers, Harper & Collins, 2023

== See also ==
- List of Eurovision Song Contest presenters

Media offices
Preceded by (Norway) Åse Kleveland	Eurovision Song Contest presenter 1987	Succeeded by (Republic of Ireland) Pat Kenny & Michelle Rocca
