= David Linx =

Belgian jazz singer and songwriter

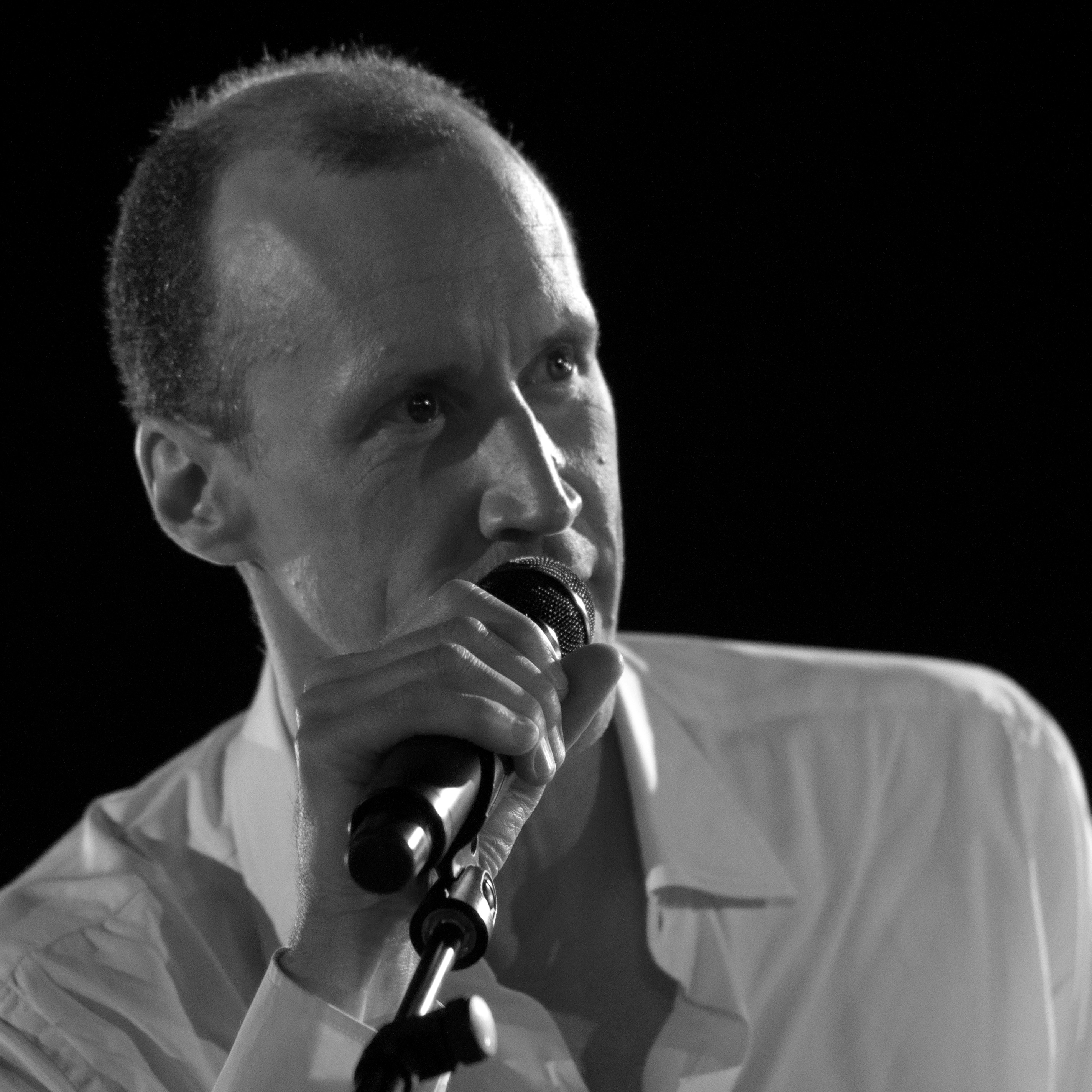
- David Linx in 2011

Background information
- Born: 22 March 1965 (age 60); Brussels, Belgium
- Genres: Jazz
- Occupations: Singer, songwriter
- Labels: Polygram, Le Chant du Monde, Naive
- Website: www.davidlinx.com

David Linx (born 22 March 1965) is a Belgian jazz singer and songwriter.

== Discography ==
=== As leader ===
- Hungry Voices with Roy Ayers, Bashiri Johnson, Brenda White King, Nicolas Fiszman, Philippe Allard, Philippe Decock, Kevin Mulligan,… (Miracle, 1988)
- A Lover’s Question with James Baldwin, Pierre Van Dormael, Steve Coleman, Slide Hampton, Toots Thielemans, … (Crepuscule, 1990/re-released in 1999 by Label Bleu-Harmonia Mundi)
- Where Rivers Join (September, 1990)
- Moon to Your Sun (Crepuscule, 1991)
- Encores, a compilation (BMR, 1995)
- Standards with Nathalie Loriers, Nic Thys and Hans Van Oosterhout (BMR, 1996)
- L'Instant D'Apres with Marc Ribot, Kevin Breit,… produced by Craig Street (Polydor/Universal, 2001)
- Changing Faces with the Brussels Jazz Orchestra and guests: Natalie Dessay, Ivan Lins, Minino Garay, Manu Codjia, Maria Joao(O+ Music/Harmonia Mundi, 2007)
- Follow the Songlines with Maria Joao, Diederik Wissels, Mario Laginha, Helge Andreas Norbakken, Christophe Wallemme and the Porto National Symphony Orchestra conducted by Dirk Brossé (Naive, 2010)
- Rock My Boat with Rhoda Scott, André Ceccarelli, Lenine, Paolo Fresu, Julien Lourau, Laurent Cugny, Nguyên Lê, Christophe Wallemme, … (Naive, 2011)
- A Different Porgy and Another Bess with Maria Joao and the Brussels Jazz Orchestra (Naive, 2012)
- a NOUsGARO, Inédits et Incontournables with André Ceccarelli, Pierre-Alain Goualch, Diego Imbert and Marlon Moore (Just Looking, 2013)
- Brel with the Brussels Jazz Orchestra (Jazz Village/Pias, 2016)
- 7000 Miles (Sound Surveyor, 2017)
- The Wordsmith with Michel Hatzigeorgiou (Sound Surveyor, 2018)
- Skin In The Game with Grégory Privat, Chris Jennings, Arnaud Dolmen, Manu Codjia and Marlon Moore (Cristal Records/Sony Music Entertainment, 2020)

With Diederik Wissels

- Kamook (Fever Music, 1992)
- If One More Day (Crepuscule, 1993)
- Up Close (Label Bleu, 1995)
- Bandarkah (Label Bleu, 1998)
- Heartland (EmArcy/Universal, 2001)
- This Time (Le Chant du Monde, 2003)
- One Heart Three Voices (E-motive, 2005)
- Winds of Change (Just Looking, 2013)
- The Whistleblowers with Paolo Fresu (Tuk, 2015)

=== As guest ===
- Andre Ceccarelli, Le Coq et La Pendule (Plus Loin, 2009)
- Laurent Cugny, A Personal Landscape: Lumiere (Universal, 2001)
- Laurent Cugny, La Tectonique Des Nuages (France Music/Yakprod, 2010)
- Claude Nougaro, La Note Bleue (Blue Note, 2004)
- Diederik Wissels, The Hillock Songstress (Igloo/Sowarex, 1995)
- Diederik Wissels, From This Day Forward (Igloo/Sowarex, 1996)
- Wise, Metrophone (Melius Prod, 2006)
- David Chevalier, Is That Pop Music?? (Cristal Records, 2013)
- Daniel Goyone
