= Elaine Paige discography =

- Studio albums: 13
- EPs: 1
- Live albums: 4
- Compilation albums: 12
- Singles: 43
- Video albums: 3
- Cast recording albums: 10
- Curated albums: 2

The discography of Elaine Paige consists of 13 studio albums, one extended play, four live albums and 43 singles. As part of her work in musical theatre, Paige has also been part of 10 cast recording albums.

== Albums ==
=== Studio albums ===
Title	Album details	Peak chart positions					Certifications
Title	Album details	UK	AUS	NL	NZ	SWE	Certifications
Sitting Pretty	Released: 3 November 1978; Label: EMI; Formats: LP, MC	—	—	—	—	—	
Elaine Paige	Released: 13 November 1981; Label: WEA; Formats: LP, MC	56	—	—	—	—	BPI: Silver
Stages	Released: 28 October 1983; Label: K-tel; Formats: LP, MC	2	20	29	3	6	BPI: 2× Platinum; RMNZ: Gold
Cinema	Released: 12 October 1984; Label: K-tel; Formats: CD, LP, MC	12	39	—	—	26	BPI: Platinum
Love Hurts	Released: 4 November 1985; Label: WEA; Formats: CD, LP, MC	8	—	—	—	—	BPI: Platinum
Christmas	Released: 17 November 1986; Label: WEA; Formats: CD, LP, MC	27	—	—	—	—	BPI: Gold
The Queen Album	Released: November 1988; Label: Siren; Formats: CD, LP, MC	51	—	—	—	—	BPI: Gold
Love Can Do That	Released: 15 April 1991; Label: RCA; Formats: CD, LP, MC	36	—	—	—	—	
Romance & the Stage	Released: 29 March 1993; Label: RCA/BMG; Formats: CD, MC	71	—	—	—	—	
Piaf	Released: 7 November 1994; Label: WEA; Formats: CD, MC	46	—	—	—	—	BPI: Silver
Essential Musicals	Released: 23 October 2006; Label: Universal Music TV; Formats: CD	46	—	—	—	—	
Elaine Paige and Friends	Released: 1 November 2010; Label: Rhino; Formats: CD	18	—	—	—	—	BPI: Silver
Miscellaneous Paige	Released: 17 July 2026; Label: Westway Music; Formats: CD	—	—	—	—	—	
"—" denotes releases that did not chart or were not released in that territory.

=== Cast recording albums ===
Title	Album details	Peak chart positions							Certifications
Title	Album details	UK	AUS	AUT	GER	NZ	SWE	US	Certifications
Fresh Hair	Released: 1970; Label: Polydor; Formats: LP; London cast recording of the Hair	—	—	—	—	—	—	—	
Billy: Original Cast Recording	Released: May 1974; Label: CBS; Formats: LP, MC; Cast recording of the musical of the same name	—	—	—	—	—	—	—	
Evita: Original London Cast Recording	Released: 27 October 1978; Label: MCA; Formats: LP, MC; London cast recording of the musical of the same name	24	81	—	—	—	—	—	BPI: Platinum
The Barrier: A Love Story	Released: 1980; Label: Cirkhor Eurodisk; Formats: 2×LP; Recorded between 1977 and 1978	—	—	—	—	—	—	—	
Cats: Original Cast Recording	Released: July 1981; Label: Polydor; Formats: 2×LP, MC; Cast recording of the musical of the same name	6	44	7	—	21	—	86	BPI: Silver
Chess	Released: 29 October 1984; Label: RCA; Formats: 2×CD, 2×LP, 2×MC; Cast recording of the musical of the same name	10	35	17	6	20	1	47	BPI: Gold
Anything Goes: 1989 London Cast Recording	Released: 1989; Label: First Night; Formats: CD, LP, MC; London cast recording of the musical of the same name	—	—	—	—	—	—	—	
Nine	Released: 1992; Label: TER; Formats: 2×CD; London cast recording of the musical of the same name	—	—	—	—	—	—	—	
The King and I: 2000 London Cast Recording	Released: September 2000; Label: WEA; Formats: CD; London cast recording of the musical of the same name	165	—	—	—	—	—	—	
Follies: New Broadway Cast Recording	Released: 29 November 2011; Label: PS Classics; Formats: 2×CD; Broadway cast recording of the musical of the same name	—	—	—	—	—	—	—	
"—" denotes releases that did not chart or were not released in that territory.

=== Live albums ===
Title	Album details
An Evening with Elaine Paige	Released: 1991; Label: RCA/BMG; Formats: CD
Live in Concert	Released: 1996; Label: RCA Camden; Formats: CD; Australia-only release
Live – Celebrating a Life on Stage	Released: 2009; Label: EP; Formats: CD
I'm Still Here: Live at the Royal Albert Hall	Released: 6 November 2015; Label: Strike Force; Formats: CD+DVD

=== Compilation albums ===
Title	Album details	Peak chart positions		Certifications
Title	Album details	UK	NZ	Certifications
Memories: The Best of Elaine Paige	Released: November 1987; Label: Telstar; Formats: CD, LP, MC	14	11	BPI: Platinum
The Collection	Released: 10 September 1990; Label: Pickwick Music; Formats: CD, LP, MC	—	—	BPI: Silver
Together: The Best of Elaine Paige & Barbara Dickson	Released: November 1992; Label: Telstar; Formats: CD, LP, MC	22	—	
Encore	Released: 19 June 1995; Label: WEA; Formats: CD, MC	20	—	BPI: Silver
From a Distance	Released: 1997; Label: BMG/Camden; Formats: CD, MC	—	—	
On Reflection: The Very Best of Elaine Paige	Released: November 1998; Label: Telstar/WEA; Formats: CD, MC	60	—	
Love Songs	Released: January 2004; Label: BMG; Formats: CD	—	—	
Centre Stage: The Very Best of Elaine Paige	Released: May 2004; Label: Warner; Formats: 2×CD	35	11	RMNZ: Gold
Songbook	Released: July 2007; Label: Sony BMG; Formats: CD	—	—	
Sweet Memories: The Essential Elaine Paige	Released: February 2008; Label: Music Club Deluxe; Formats: 2×CD	133	—	
The Ultimate Collection	Released: 12 May 2014; Label: Rhino; Formats: CD, 2×CD, digital download	74	—	
12 Timeless Songs	Released: 2 March 2018; Label: Warner Music; Formats: CD	—	—	
"—" denotes releases that did not chart or were not released in that territory.

=== Video albums ===
Title	Album details	Peak chart positions
Title	Album details	UK
Elaine Paige in Concert	Released: October 1991; Label: BMG Video; Formats: VHS	20 (Note: Chart peak in 1995.)
Celebrating 40 Years on Stage	Released: 1 March 2010; Label: Blink TV; Formats: DVD	5
I'm Still Here: Live at the Royal Albert Hall	Released: 6 November 2015; Label: Strike Force; Formats: DVD+CD	—
"—" denotes releases that did not chart.

=== Curated albums ===
Tying in with her weekly radio show, Paige has been involved in the compilation of two albums featuring selected tracks from musical theatre.

Title	Album details	Peak chart positions	Certifications
Title	Album details	UK Compilation	Certifications
Elaine Paige Presents the Musicals	Released: 25 November 2016; Label: Union Square Music; Formats: 3×CD, digital download	8	BPI: Silver
Elaine Paige Presents Showstoppers from the Musicals	Released: 24 November 2017; Label: Union Square Music; Formats: 3×CD, digital download	14	

== EPs ==
Title	EP details
EP/EP	Released: July 1979; Label: MCA; Formats: 7"

== Singles ==
Title	Year	Peak chart positions								Certifications	Albums
Title	Year	UK	AUS	BEL	GER	IRE	NL	NZ	SWI	Certifications	Albums
"You Can't Take Away (My Love for You)"	1976	—	—	—	—	—	—	—	—		Non-album single
"Ireland"	1978	—	—	—	—	—	—	—	—		The Barrier: A Love Story
"Don't Walk Away Till I Touch You"	1978	46	—	—	—	—	—	—	—		Sitting Pretty
"We're Home Again" (France-only release)	1978	—	—	—	—	—	—	—	—		Sitting Pretty
"If You Don't Want My Love"	1981	—	—	—	—	—	—	—	—		Elaine Paige
"Hot as Sun" (Germany-only release)	1981	—	—	—	—	—	—	—	—		Elaine Paige
"Falling Down to Earth"	1981	—	—	—	—	—	—	—	—		Elaine Paige
"Memory"	1981	6	—	—	—	7	—	33	—	BPI: Silver	Cats
"Is Anyone There?"	1981	—	—	—	—	—	—	—	—		Sitting Pretty
"The Far Side of the Bay"	1981	—	—	—	—	—	—	—	—		Elaine Paige
"The Second Time (Theme from Bilitis)"	1982	—	—	—	—	26	50	—	—		Elaine Paige
"If You Don't Want My Love" (reissue)	1982	—	78	10	—	—	13	—	—		Elaine Paige
"A Knight in Black Leather"	1982	—	—	—	—	—	—	—	—		Non-album singles
"Ave Maria" (with the London Philharmonic Orchestra)	1982	—	—	—	—	—	—	—	—		Non-album singles
"Be on Your Own"	1983	—	—	—	—	—	—	—	—		Stages
"Running Back for Me"	1983	—	—	—	—	—	—	—	—		Stages
"Like an Image Passing By"	1984	126	—	—	—	—	—	—	—		Non-album single
"Sometimes (Theme from Champions)"	1984	72	—	—	—	—	—	—	—		Cinema
"Nobody's Side"	1984	134	—	—	—	—	—	—	—		Chess
"I Know Him So Well" (with Barbara Dickson)	1984	1	21	13	22	1	16	9	7	BPI: Gold	Chess
"The Windmills of Your Mind"	1985	—	—	—	—	—	—	—	—		Cinema
"Tonight Is the Night"	1985	—	—	—	—	—	—	—	—		Non-album singles
"Memory" (Australia-only reissue)	1985	—	19	—	—	—	—	—	—		Non-album singles
"Heaven Help My Heart"	1985	121	—	—	—	—	—	—	—		Chess
"For You"	1986	170	—	—	—	—	—	—	—		Love Hurts
"Nobody's Side" (remix)	1986	111	—	—	—	—	—	—	—		Non-album single
"Walking in the Air"	1986	130	—	—	—	—	—	—	—		Christmas
"On My Own" (US-only release)	1987	—	—	—	—	—	—	—	—		Stages
"The Second Time" (reissue)	1987	69	—	—	—	—	—	—	—		Non-album single
"Father Christmas Eyes"	1987	—	—	—	—	—	—	—	—		Christmas
"Take Me Back"	1988	147	—	—	—	—	—	—	—		Non-album single
"Radio Ga Ga"	1989	—	—	—	—	—	—	—	—		The Queen Album
"I Get a Kick Out of You"	1989	—	—	—	—	—	—	—	—		Anything Goes
"Blow Gabriel Blow"	1990	—	—	—	—	—	—	—	—		Anything Goes
"Well Almost"	1991	110	—	—	—	—	—	—	—		Love Can Do That
"Love Can Do That" (Continental Europe-only release)	1991	—	—	—	—	—	—	—	—		Love Can Do That
"Heart Don't Change My Mind"	1991	149	—	—	—	—	—	—	—		Love Can Do That
"Oxygen"	1991	—	—	—	—	—	—	—	—		Love Can Do That
"Hymne à l’amour (If You Love Me)"	1995	68	—	—	—	—	—	—	—		Piaf
"As If We Never Said Goodbye"	1995	—	—	—	—	—	—	—	—		Encore
"Memory" (re-recording)	1998	36	—	—	—	—	—	—	—		Non-album single
"It's Only Life" (with Sinead O'Connor)	2010	—	—	—	—	—	—	—	—		Elaine Paige and Friends
"Sing a Rainbow" (with the Young Voices of The Children's Trust)	2020	—	—	—	—	—	—	—	—		Non-album single
"—" denotes releases that did not chart or were not released in that territory.

== Other appearances ==
Year	Album title	Notes
1972	Hatching Out	With the group Sparrow; lead vocals on "Don't Ask", "Many Things Are Clear", "Dream Song", "Rainsun Song" and "Hello Goodbye". The last track was not on the original LP, only on a 7" single.
1998	Songs from Whistle Down the Wind	Recording of the song "If Only".
2000	Michael Ball – Christmas	Duet on "As Long as There's Christmas", a cover of the song that had originally appeared in Beauty and the Beast: The Enchanted Christmas.
2001	Andrew Lloyd Webber – Masterpiece	Live recording of concert at the Great Hall of the People, Beijing, China. She performs "Don't Cry for Me Argentina", "As If We Never Said Goodbye" and "Ni Yong You Wo De Wei Lai – Friends for Life" (the Chinese translation of "Amigos Para Siempre").
2010	I Dreamed a Dream – The Susan Boyle Story	Live duet of "I Know Him So Well" with Susan Boyle.
