= Centre Stage: The Very Best of Elaine Paige =

Greatest hits album by Elaine Paige
- Released: May 2004
- Label: Warner Strategic Marketing (UK)

Elaine Paige chronology
A Collection (2002)	Centre Stage: The Very Best of Elaine Paige (2004)	Songbook (2007)

Centre Stage: The Very Best of Elaine Paige is a compilation album by Elaine Paige, released in May 2004.

== Background ==
The album features tracks primarily taken from her back catalogue with Warner Music, and was released by WSM (Warner Special Markets). It is the second compilation album to be subtitled "The Very Best of Elaine Paige" after On Reflection: The Very Best of Elaine Paige.

The tracks "Something in Red" and "I Didn't Know I Was Saying Goodbye" were recorded for this album and produced by Bobby Huff. The tracks "Change the World", "From the Heart", "One More Time", "Somebody Make Me Laugh", "Is It Me" and "Kind to Animals" were recorded in 2000 and produced by Mike Moran for an album that was planned but never released.

The live recordings of "Miss You Nights" and "Let It Be Me", both duets with Cliff Richard, are taken from DVD of his 1999 London concert Live in the Park.

== Artwork and packaging ==
The two disc album was issued in a single jewel case with a cardboard sleeve. The discs had full colour labels. The album was designed by Mental Block and featured photography by Paul Cox.

== Track listing ==
=== Disc One ===
1. "Something in Red" – 4:35 (Angela Kaset)
  - Producer – Bobby Huff
2. "Memory" – 4:15 (Andrew Lloyd Webber, T.S. Eliot, Trevor Nunn) – from the soundtrack of Cats
  - Producers – Andrew Lloyd Webber and Nigel Wright
  - Engineer – Robin Sellars
3. "I Know Him So Well" – Duet with Barbara Dickson – 4:15 (Benny Andersson, Tim Rice, Björn Ulvaeus) – from the album Chess
  - Producers – Benny Andersson, Björn Ulvaeus and Tim Rice
  - Engineer – Michael B. Tretow
4. "Miss You Nights" (live) – Duet with Cliff Richard – 4:11 (Dave Townsend) – from the soundtrack of Cliff Richard's DVD Live in the Park
  - Producer – Brian Klein
  - Recorded by Keith Bessey
5. "The Perfect Year" – 3:21 (Andrew Lloyd Webber, Christopher Hampton, Don Black) – from the musical Sunset Boulevard and the album Encore
  - Producers – Andrew Lloyd Webber and Nigel Wright
  - Engineer – by Robin Sellars
6. "September Song" (live) – 4:02 (Kurt Weill, Maxwell Anderson)
  - Producer – Stella Hanson
7. "Non, je ne regrette rien" – 3:42 (Charles Dumont, Michel Vaucaire) – from the album Piaf
  - Producer – Mike Moran
  - Arranger – Del Newman
  - Engineer – Tony Taverner
8. "Another Suitcase in Another Hall" – 3:27 (Andrew Lloyd Webber, Tim Rice) – from the album Stages
  - Producer and Orchestral Arrangement Tony Visconti
  - Rhythm Arrangement – Robin Smith
  - Engineers – Bryan Evans, Chris Porter and Keith Grant
9. "Change the World" – 3:51 (Tommy Sims, Gordon Kennedy, Wayne Kirkpatrick) -
  - Producer – Mike Moran
10. "Cry Me a River" (live) – 4:58 (Arthur Hamilton) - recorded during the BBC television series Parkinson
11. "From the Heart" – 4:53 (Diane Warren)
  - Producer – Mike Moran
12. "Wishin' on a Star" – 3:52 (Billie Rae Calvin) – from the album Christmas
  - Producer and Strings Arrangement – Tony Visconti
  - Orchestral Arrangement and Musical Director – Robin Smith
  - Assistant Engineer – Sam Smith
  - Mixed by Sid Wells and Tony Visconti
13. "I Dreamed a Dream" (live) – 4:19 (Claude-Michel Schonberg, Alain Boublil, Herbert Kretzmer) – from the album Encore
  - Producer – Stella Hanson
14. "Don't Cry for Me Argentina" – 5:49 (Andrew Lloyd Webber, Tim Rice) – from the album Evita: Original London Cast Recording
  - Producers – Andrew Lloyd Webber and Tim Rice
  - Engineer – David Hamilton-Smith
15. "One More Time" – 4:12 (Richard Marx)
  - Producer – Mike Moran
16. "Hymne a L'Amour (If You Love Me)" – 2:53 (Edith Piaf, Marguerite Monnot, Geoffrey Parsons) – from the album Piaf
  - Producer – Mike Moran
  - Arranger – Del Newman
  - Engineer – Tony Taverner
17. "On My Own" – 3:49 (Claude-Michel Schonberg, Alain Boublil, Herbert Kretzmer, Trevor Nunn, John Caird) – from the album Memories: The Best of Elaine Paige
  - Producer – Tony Visconti
18. "The Rose" – 3:45 (Amanda McBroom) – from the album Cinema
  - Producer – Tony Visconti
19. "Ave Maria" – 3:57 (J. S. Bach, Charles Gounod) – from the album Christmas
  - Producer – Mike Batt

=== Disc Two ===
1. "I Didn't Know I Was Saying Goodbye" – 4:22 (Angela Kaset, Lee Thomas Miller)
2. "Let It Be Me" (live) – Duet with Cliff Richard – 3:47 (Gilbert Becaud, Pierre Delanoe, Manny Curtis) – from the soundtrack of Cliff Richard's DVD Live in the Park
3. "La Vie en rose" – 2:44 (Edith Piaf, Louiguy) – from the album Piaf
4. "Somebody Make Me Laugh" – 4:05 (Bette C. Sussman, Terry Cox)
5. "As If We Never Said Goodbye" – 5:20 (Andrew Lloyd Webber, Christopher Hampton, Don Black, Amy Powers) – from the musical Sunset Boulevard and the album Encore
6. "With One Look" – 3:30 (Andrew Lloyd Webber, Christopher Hampton, Don Black, Amy Powers) – from the musical Sunset Boulevard and the album Encore
7. "How Long Has This Been Going On?" – 3:44 (George Gershwin, Ira Gershwin) – from the album Romance & the Stage
8. "This Is Where I Came In" – 3:44 (Phil Galdston, Wendy Waldman) – from the album Love Hurts
9. "Unchained Melody" – 3:44 (Alex North, Hy Zaret) – from the album Cinema
10. "Mon Dieu" – 3:49 (Charles Dumont, Michel Vaucaire) – from the album Piaf
11. "For You" – 2:53 (Judie Tzuke, Mike Paxman) – from the album Love Hurts
12. "Alfie" – 2:52 (Burt Bacharach, Hal David) – from the album Cinema
13. "I Only Have Eyes for You" – 4:08 (Harry Warren, Al Dubin) – from the album Love Can Do That
14. "Je Sais Comment (All This I Know)" – 3:31 (Julien Bouque, Robert Chauvign, Norman Newel, Hal Shaper) – from the album Piaf
15. "Is It Me" – 4:27 (Sutton, Booker)
16. "All Things Considered" – 3:42 (Vangelis, Tim Rice, Elaine Paige) – from the album Love Hurts
17. "Shaking You" – 3:53 (David Foster, Paul Gordon, Tom Keane) – from the album Love Hurts
18. "Kind to Animals" – 4:16 (Charlie Dore, Danny Schogger)
19. "Les Trois Cloches (The Three Bells)" – 3:56 (Jean Villard/Bert Reisfeld) - from the album Piaf

== Personnel ==
=== Musicians ===
- Elaine Paige – vocals
- Barbara Dickson – vocals
- Cliff Richard – vocals

=== Production ===
- Mastered by Jon Astley at Close to the Edge
- Distributed by The Entertainment Network
- Design by Mental Block
- Photography by Paul Cox
