= Encore (Elaine Paige album) =

Compilation album by Elaine Paige
- Released: 19 June 1995
- Genre: Show tunes
- Length: 52:37
- Label: Warner Music Group
- Producer: Andrew Lloyd Webber; Nigel Wright; Anthony Pugh; Tony Visconti; Mike Moran

Elaine Paige chronology
Piaf (1994)	Encore (1995)	Performance (1996)

Encore is the title of a solo album released in 1995 by Elaine Paige. The album peaked at number 20 on the UK Albums Chart in July 1995. All the tracks are taken from musical theatre.

It is primarily a compilation of material from earlier recordings but also includes three new recordings, all taken from the musical Sunset Boulevard, the London production of which Paige joined the same year.

The album was released on the WEA label and therefore included no material from Paige's RCA recordings, Love Can Do That and Romance & the Stage.

== Track listing ==
No.	Title	Writer(s)	From the musical	Length
1.	"As If We Never Said Goodbye"	Andrew Lloyd Webber; Don Black; Christopher Hampton; Amy Powers	Sunset Boulevard	5:22
2.	"The Perfect Year"	Webber; Black; Hampton	Sunset Boulevard	3:31
3.	"Memory"	Webber; T.S. Eliot; Trevor Nunn	Cats	4:13
4.	"I Know Him So Well"	Benny Andersson; Björn Ulvaeus; Rice	Chess	4:15
5.	"Another Suitcase in Another Hall"	Webber; Rice	Evita	3:27
6.	"I Don't Know How to Love Him"	Webber; Rice	Jesus Christ Superstar	3:54
7.	"On My Own"	Claude-Michel Schönberg; Alain Boublil; Jean-Marc Natel	Les Misérables	3:48
8.	"I Dreamed a Dream" (Live)	Schönberg; Boublil; Natel	Les Misérables	4:25
9.	"Mon Dieu"	Charles Dumont; Michel Vaucaire	Piaf	3:47
10.	"Hymne à l'amour (If You Love Me)"	Marguerite Monnot; Édith Piaf; Geoffrey Parsons	Paris chante toujours	2:53
11.	"Non, je ne regrette rien"	Dumont; Piaf	Piaf	4:10
12.	"With One Look"	Webber; Black; Hampton; Powers	Sunset Boulevard	3:19
13.	"Don't Cry for Me Argentina" (Live)	Webber; Rice	Evita	5:59
Total length:				52:37

== Notes ==
"As If We Never Said Goodbye", "The Perfect Year" and "With One Look" were all recorded in 1995 for this release. Produced by Andrew Lloyd Webber and Nigel Wright. The recordings were engineered by Robin Sellars and Dave Hunt. The orchestra was conducted by Michael Reed.

"Memory", "Another Suitcase in Another Hall" and "I Don't Know How to Love Him" are taken from Paige's 1983 album Stages produced by Tony Visconti.

"I Know Him So Well" is the 1985 UK No.1 hit that Paige recorded with Barbara Dickson for the concept album Chess, released in 1984. It was also featured on Paige's 1985 solo album Love Hurts.

"On My Own" was a recording produced in 1987 by Tony Visconti for Paige's compilation album Memories: The Best of Elaine Paige.

"I Dreamed a Dream" and "Don't Cry for Me Argentina" are live recordings from a 1993 concert for the BBC at the Birmingham Symphony Hall. They were re-mixed for this release by Nigel Wright.

"Mon Dieu", "Hymne à l'Amour (If You Love Me)" and "Non, Je Ne Regrette Rien" were all taken from the 1994 album Piaf, produced by Mike Moran.

== Charts ==
Chart performance for Encore
Chart (1995)	Peak position
Scottish Albums (OCC)	33
UK Albums (OCC)	20

== Certifications and sales ==
Region	Certification	Certified units/sales
United Kingdom (BPI)	Silver	60,000^{^}
^{^} Shipments figures based on certification alone.
