= Récital 1961 =

Live album by Édith Piaf
- Released: January 1961
- Recorded: December 29, 1960
- Genre: Chanson
- Label: EMI

Récital 1961, also known as Edith Piaf a 'l'Olympia, Edith Piaf at the Paris Olympia, Olympia 1961, Olympia '61, and A l'Olympia 1961, is an album from Édith Piaf recorded live on December 29, 1960, at L'Olympia in Paris. The album was released in January 1961. Piaf was accompanied by the Orchestre Et Choeurs conducted by Jacque Lesage. Eight of the nine songs on the album were composed by Charles Dumont. The album was released on the Columbia label (FSX 133). The cover painting was by artist Doug Davis.

Piaf's December 1960 performances at Olympia were a comeback following a two-year illness. She performed before a "shouting, cheering crowd."

== Track listing ==
Side A
A1. "Les Mots D'amour" (Charles Dumont, M. Rivgauche)
A2. "Les Flons Flons Du Bal" (C. Dumont, M. Vaucaire)
A3. "T'es L'homme Qu'il Me Faut" (C. Dumont, E. Piaf)
A4. "Mon Dieu" (C. Dumont, M. Vaucaire)
A5. "Mon Vieux Lucien" (C. Dumont, M. Rivgauche)

Side B
B1. "La Ville Inconnue" (C. Dumont, M. Vaucaire)
B2. "Non, je ne regrette rien" (C. Dumont, M. Vaucaire)
B3. "La Belle Histoire D'amour" (C. Dumont, E. Piaf)
B4. "Les Blouses Blanches" (Marguerite Monnot, M. Rivgauche)

== See also ==
- Récital 1962
