= À l'Olympia =

À l'Olympia (French; "At the Olympia" in English) may refer to:

- Olympia 1961, an album by Jacques Brel
- Olympia 1964, an album by Jacques Brel
- En Direct de L'Olympia, a 1966 album by Mireille Mathieu
- À l'Olympia (Alan Stivell album), a 1972 album
- À l'Olympia (Jorge Ben album), a 1975 album
- À l'Olympia (Celine Dion album), a 1994 album
- Jeff Buckley Live À L'Olympia, a 1995 album
- Émilie Simon À L'Olympia, a 2006 album
- Récital 1961, Édith Piaf at the Olympia
- Récital 1962, Édith Piaf at the Olympia
