= Polichinelle (disambiguation) =

Polichinelle, or Pulcinella, is a character in commedia dell'arte.

Polichinelle may also refer to:

- Polichinelle (album), by The Prayer Boat, 2001
- "Polichinelle", a 1962 song by Edith Piaf
- "Polichinelle", a 1967 song by the French singer France Gall
- Polichinelle, a band whose members include Bubu and Serafina Ouistiti
- "Polichinelle in F♯ minor", a piece for solo piano by Sergei Rachmaninoff, Morceaux de fantaisie (1892) Op. 3, No. 4
