= Elaine Paige Live =

2009 live album by Elaine Paige

Live album by Elaine Paige
- Released: 2009
- Recorded: Vicar Street, Dublin
- Genre: MOR
- Producer: Elaine Paige

Elaine Paige chronology
Songbook (2007)	Elaine Paige Live (2009)	Elaine Paige and Friends (2010)

Elaine Paige Live is a live solo album by Elaine Paige, recorded and released in 2009 during an early date of Paige's 40th anniversary concert tour.

== Background ==
It was produced by Paige and the tour's musical director Chris Egan. The recording, made at Vicar Street, Dublin, features tracks from throughout her 40-year theatrical career.

As well as the musical theatre songs with which she is closely related, the album features less obvious performances such as The Beatles song, "Yesterday" that Paige performed for her first Evita audition, and "Shoot the Breeze" that was taught to her by the song's composer Dustin Hoffman.

The final, bonus track on the album is a studio recording, "The Things You Are to Me", written by Brendan Graham and Rolf Løvland and recorded by Paige for their Secret Garden album, Inside I'm Singing. As of March 2009, this was not yet released in the United Kingdom.

== Marketing and promotion ==
The album was self-financed by Paige and sold at concert venues as well as via her website. It is available on CD in the United States through Amazon.com under the title Celebrating 40 Years On Stage on a PBS label, containing the same 18 live tracks and additional studio bonus track.

The album was released digitally on 21 September 2009.

== Track listing ==
1. "Life Goes On" (Craig Doerge/Paul Williams)
2. "Tomorrow" (Charles Strouse/Martin Charnin)
3. "Easy to Be Hard" (Galt MacDermot/James Rado/Gerome Ragni)
4. "Broadway Baby" (Stephen Sondheim)
5. "I Don't Know How to Love Him" (Tim Rice/Andrew Lloyd Webber)
6. "Shoot the Breeze" (Dustin Hoffman/Bette Midler)
7. "Yesterday" (John Lennon/Paul McCartney)
8. "Argentina Introduction" (Andrew Lloyd Webber)
9. "Don't Cry for Me Argentina" (Tim Rice/Andrew Lloyd Webber)
10. "As If We Never Said Goodbye" (Andrew Lloyd Webber/Don Black/Christopher Hampton/Amy Powers)
11. "By the Sea" (Stephen Sondheim)
12. "I Get a Kick Out of You" (Cole Porter)
13. "I Know Him So Well" (Benny Andersson/Björn Ulvaeus/Tim Rice)
14. "Poor Old John" (Marguerite Monnot/Rene Rouzaud/Mitchell)
15. "Non, Je Ne Regrette Rien" (Charles Dumont/Michel Vaucaire/Edith Piaf)
16. "Hymne a L'Amour (If You Love Me)" (Marguerite Monnot/Edith Piaf/Geoffrey Parsons)
17. "Memory" (Andrew Lloyd Webber/T. S. Eliot/Trevor Nunn)
18. "With One Look" (Andrew Lloyd Webber/Don Black/Christopher Hampton/Amy Powers)
19. "The Things You Are to Me" (Brendan Graham/Rolf Løvland)

== Personnel ==
=== Musicians ===
- Elaine Paige - vocals
- Chris Egan - musical direction, piano
- Neil Angilley - keyboards
- Paul Frankish - keyboards
- Pete Callard - electric guitars, acoustic guitars
- Andy Pask - electric bass, acoustic bass
- Mike Smith - drums
- Steve Socci - percussion
- Adrian Revell - flute, clarinet, saxophones
- Gareth Griffiths - violin
- Brian Wright - violin
- Adrian Smith - viola
- Chris Fish - cello
- Annie Skates - backing vocals

=== Production credits ===
- Producer - Elaine Paige and Chris Egan
- Mixer and engineer - Richard Brooker
- Pro Tools and post-production - Trystan Francis
- Recording - Andy Knightley
- Mixed at Vivace Music Studios
- Mastered by Lowland Masters
- Music Production Services by Vivace
