= From a Distance (Elaine Paige album) =

Compilation album by Elaine Paige
- Released: 1997
- Label: BMG

Elaine Paige chronology
Performance (1996)	From a Distance (1997)	On Reflection: The Very Best of Elaine Paige (1998)

From a Distance is a compilation album released in 1997 by Elaine Paige.

It is primarily a compilation of material from Love Can Do That and Romance & the Stage, but also includes live performances "One Night in Bangkok" and "Bohemian Rhapsody" from Elaine Paige in Concert, as well as "From a Distance", recorded during the Love Can Do That sessions but previously only released as a B-side.

The album was released on BMG's Camden label.

== Track listing ==
1. "I Only Have Eyes for You" (Al Dubin/Harry Warren)
2. "From A Distance" (Julie Gold)
3. "One Night in Bangkok" (live) (Benny Andersson/Tim Rice/Björn Ulvaeus)
4. "True Colours" (Tom Kelly/Billy Steinberg)
5. "He's Out of My Life" (Tom Bahler)
6. "Bohemian Rhapsody" (live) (Freddie Mercury)
7. "If I Love You" (Toni Jolene/Jim Weatherly)
8. "As Time Goes By" (Herman Hupfeld)
9. "Mad About the Boy" (Noël Coward)
10. "Smoke Gets in Your Eyes" (Jerome Kern/Otto Harbach)
11. "September Song" (Maxwell Anderson/Kurt Weill)
12. "Oxygen" (Nik Kershaw)
13. "Song of a Summer Night" (Frank Loesser)
14. "Love Can Do That" (Diane Warren)
15. "Well Almost" (Mike Chapman/Holly Knight)
16. "Heart Don't Change My Mind" (Diane Warren/Robbie Buchanan)
17. "Only The Very Best" (Michel Berger/Luc Plamondon/Tim Rice)
18. "Grow Young" (Jimmy Webb)
