= List of songs recorded by Édith Piaf =

This is a list of songs recorded by the mid-20th century French singer Édith Piaf.

Year	Title	Notes
1933	Entre Saint-Ouen et Clignancourt	
1934	L'Étranger	
1935	Mon apéro	
1935	La Java de Cézigue	
1935	Fais-moi valser	
1936	Les Mômes de la cloche	
1936	J'suis mordue	
1936	Mon légionnaire	
1936	Le Contrebandier	
1936	La Fille et le chien	
1936	La Julie jolie	
1936	Va danser	
1936	Chand d'habits	
1936	Reste	
1936	Les Hiboux	
1936	Quand même	From the film La Garçonne
1936	La Petite boutique	
1936	Y'avait du soleil	
1936	Il n'est pas distingué	
1936	Les Deux ménétriers	
1936	Mon amant de la coloniale	
1936	C'est toi le plus fort	
1936	Le Fanion de la légion	
1936	J'entends la sirène	
1936	Ding, din, dong	
1936	Madeleine qu'avait du cœur	
1936	Les Marins ça fait des voyages	
1936	Simple comme bonjour	
1936	Le Mauvais matelot	
1936	Celui qui ne savait pas pleurer	
1937	Le Grand Voyage du pauvre Nègre	
1937	Un jeune homme chantait	
1937	Tout fout le camp	
1937	Ne m'écris pas	
1937	Partance	With Raymond Asso
1937	Dans un bouge du Vieux Port	
1937	Mon cœur est au coin d'une rue	
1938	С'est lui que mon cœur a choisi	
1938	Paris-Méditerranée	
1938	La Java en mineur	
1938	Browning	
1938	Le Chacal	
1938	Corrèqu' et réguyer	
1939	Y'en a un de trop	
1939	Elle fréquentait la rue Pigalle	
1939	Le Petit Monsieur triste	
1939	Les Deux Copains	
1939	Je n'en connais pas la fin	
1940	Embrasse-moi	
1940	On danse sur ma chanson	
1940	Sur une colline	
1940	C'est la moindre des choses	
1940	Escale	
1940	L'Accordéoniste	
1941	Où sont-ils, mes petits copains?	
1941	C'était un jour de fête	
1941	C'est un monsieur très distingué	
1941	J'ai dansé avec l'Amour	From the film Montmartre-sur-Seine
1941	Tu es partout	From the film Montmartre-sur-Seine
1941	L'Homme des bars	
1941	Le Vagabond	
1942	Jimmy, c'est lui	
1942	Un coin tout bleu (from the film Montmartre-sur-Seine	
1942	Sans y penser	
1942	Un monsieur me suit dans la rue	
1943	J'ai qu'à l'regarder...	
1943	Le Chasseur de l'hôtel	
1943	C'était une histoire d'amour	
1943	Le Brun et le Blond	
1943	Monsieur Saint-Pierre	
1943	Coup de Grisou	
1943	De l'autre côté de la rue	
1943	La Demoiselle du cinqième	
1943	C'était si bon	
1943	Je ne veux plus laver la vaisselle	
1943	La Valse de Paris	
1943	Chanson d'amour	
1944	Les deux rengaines	
1944	Y'a pas d'printemps	
1944	Les Histoires de coeur	
1944	C'est toujours la même histoire	
1945	Le Disque usé	
1945	Elle a...	
1945	Regarde-moi toujours comme ça	
1945	Les Gars qui marchaient	
1945	Il Riait	
1945	Monsieur Ernest a réussi	
1946	La Vie en rose	
1946	Les trois cloches	With Les Compagnons de la chanson
1946	Dans ma rue	
1946	J'm'en fous pas mal	
1946	C'est merveilleux	From the film Étoile sans lumière
1946	Adieu mon cœur	
1946	Le Chant du pirate	
1946	Céline	With Les Compagnons de la Chanson
1946	Le petit homme	
1946	Le Roi a fait battre tambour	With Les Compagnons de la Chanson
1946	Dans les prisons de Nantes	With Les Compagnons de la Chanson
1946	Elle chantait	With Les Compagnons de la Chanson
1946	Mariage	
1946	Un refrain courait dans la rue	
1946	Miss Otis Regrets	
1946	Il est né, le divin enfant	
1947	C'est pour ça	From the film Neuf garçons, un cœur
1947	Qu'as-tu fait John?	
1947	Sophie	From the film Neuf garçons, un cœur
1947	Mais qu'est-ce que j'ai ?	
1947	Le Geste	
1947	Si tu partais	
1947	Une chanson à trois temps	
1947	Un Homme comme les autres	
1947	Les Cloches sonnent	
1947	Johnny Fedora et Alice Blue Bonnet	
1947	Le Rideau tombe avant la fin	
1947	Elle avait son sourire	
1948	Monsieur Lenoble	
1948	Les Amants de Paris	
1948	Il a chanté	
1948	Les vieux bateaux	
1948	Il pleut	
1948	Cousu de fil blanc	
1948	Amour du mois de mai	
1948	Monsieur X	
1949	Bal dans ma rue	
1949	Pour moi tout' seule	
1949	Pleure pas	
1949	Le Prisonnier de la tour (Si le roi savait ça Isabelle)	
1949	L'Orgue des amoureux	
1949	Dany	
1949	Paris	From the film L'Homme aux mains d'argile
1950	Hymne à l'amour	
1950	Le Chevalier de Paris	
1950	Il fait bon t'aimer	
1950	La p'tite Marie	
1950	Tous les amoureux chantent	
1950	Il y avait	
1950	C'est d'la faute à tes yeux	
1950	C'est un gars	
1950	Hymn to Love	
1950	Autumn Leaves	
1950	The Three Bells	
1950	Le Ciel est fermé	
1950	La Fête continue	
1950	Simply a Waltz	
1950	La Vie en rose	English version
1951	Padam, padam...	
1951	Avant l'heure	
1951	L'homme que j'aimerai	
1951	Du matin jusqu'au soir	
1951	Demain (Il fera jour)	
1951	C'est toi	With Eddie Constantine
1951	Rien de rien	
1951	Si, si, si, si	With Eddie Constantine
1951	À l'enseigne de la fille sans cœur	
1951	Télégramme	
1951	Une enfant	
1951	Plus bleu que tes yeux	
1951	Le Noël de la rue	
1951	La Valse de l'amour	
1951	La Rue aux chansons	
1951	Jezebel	
1951	Chante-moi	With M. Jiteau
1951	Chanson de Catherine	
1951	Chanson bleue	
1951	Je hais les dimanches	
1952	Au bal de la chance	
1952	Elle a dit	
1952	Notre-Dame de Paris	
1952	Mon ami m'a donné	
1952	Je t'ai dans la peau	From the film Boum sur Paris
1952	Monsieur et madame	
1952	Ça gueule ça, madame	With Jacques Pills, from the film Boum sur Paris
1953	Bravo pour le clown	
1953	Sœur Anne	
1953	N'y va pas Manuel	
1953	Les Amants de Venise	
1953	L'effet qu'tu m'fais	
1953	Johnny, tu n'es pas un ange	
1953	Jean et Martine	
1953	Et moi...	
1953	Pour qu'elle soit jolie ma chanson	With Jacques Pills, from the film Boum sur Paris
1953	Les Croix	
1953	Le bel indifférent	
1953	Heureuse	
1954	La Goualante du pauvre jean	
1954	Enfin le printemps	
1954	Retour	
1954	Mea culpa	
1954	Le "Ça ira"	From the film Si Versailles m'était conté
1954	Avec ce soleil	
1954	L'Homme au piano	
1954	Sérénade du Pavé	From the film French Cancan
1954	Sous le ciel de Paris	
1955	Un grand amour qui s'achève	
1955	Miséricorde	
1955	C'est à Hambourg	
1955	Légende	
1955	Le Chemin des forains	
1955	La Vie en rose (Spanish)	
1956	Heaven Have Mercy	
1956	One Little Man	
1956	'Cause I Love You	
1956	Chante-Moi	In English
1956	Don't Cry	
1956	I Shouldn't Care	
1956	My Lost Melody	
1956	Avant nous	
1956	Et pourtant	
1956	Marie la Française	
1956	Les amants d'un jour	
1956	L'Homme à la moto	
1956	Soudain une vallée	
1956	Une dame	
1956	Toi qui sais	
1957	La Foule	
1957	Les Prisons du roy	
1957	Opinion publique	
1957	Salle d'attente	
1957	Les Grognards	
1957	Comme moi	
1958	C'est un homme terrible	
1958	Je me souviens d'une chanson	
1958	Je sais comment	
1958	Tatave	
1958	Les Orgues de barbarie	
1958	Eden Blues	
1958	Le Gitan et la fille	
1958	Fais comme si	
1958	Le Ballet des cœurs	
1958	Les Amants de demain	
1958	Les Neiges de Finlande	
1958	Tant qu'il y aura des jours	
1958	Un étranger	
1958	Mon manège à moi	
1959	Milord	
1959	T'es beau, tu sais	
1960	Non, je ne regrette rien	
1960	La Vie, l'amour	
1960	Rue de Siam	
1960	Jean l'Espagnol	
1960	La belle histoire d'amour	
1960	La Ville inconnue	
1960	Non, la vie n'est pas triste	
1960	Kiosque à journaux	
1960	Le Métro de Paris	
1960	Cri du cœur	
1960	Les Blouses blanches	
1960	Les Flons-Flons du bal	
1960	Les Mots d'amour	
1960	T'es l'homme qu'il me faut	
1960	Mon Dieu	
1960	Boulevard du crime	
1960	C'est l'amour	
1960	Des histoires	
1960	Ouragan	
1960	Je suis à toi	
1960	Les Amants merveilleux	
1960	Je m'imagine	
1960	Jérusalem	
1960	Le vieux piano	
1961	C'est peut-être ça	
1961	Les bleuets d'azur	
1961	Quand tu dors	
1961	Mon vieux Lucien	
1961	Le Dénicheur	
1961	J'n'attends plus rien	
1961	J'en ai passé des nuits	
1961	Exodus	
1961	Faut pas qu'il se figure	
1961	Les Amants	With Charles Dumont
1961	No Regrets	
1961	Le Billard électrique	
1961	Marie-Trottoir	
1961	Qu'il était triste cet anglais	
1961	Toujours aimer	
1961	Mon Dieu	English version
1961	Le Bruit des villes	
1961	Dans leur baiser	
1962	Le Droit d'aimer	
1962	À quoi ça sert l'amour	With Théo Sarapo
1962	Fallait-il	
1962	Une valse	
1962	Inconnu excepte de dieu	With Charles Dumont
1962	Quatorze Juillet	
1962	Les Amants de Teruel	With Mikis Theodorakis/Jacques Plante
1962	Roulez tambours	
1962	Musique à tout va	
1962	Le Rendez-vous	
1962	Toi, tu l'entends pas!	
1962	Carmen's Story	
1962	On cherche un Auguste	
1962	Ça fait drôle	
1962	Emporte-moi	
1962	Polichinelle	
1962	Le petit brouillard (Un petit brouillard)	
1962	Le Diable de la Bastille	
1963	C'était pas moi	
1963	Le Chant d'amour	
1963	Tiens, v'là un marin	
1963	J'en ai tant vu	
1963	Traqué	
1963	Les Gens	
1963	Margot cœur gros	
1963	Monsieur Incognito	
1963	Un Dimanche à Londres	With Théo Sarapo
1963	L'Homme de Berlin	Piaf's last recording
