= Récital 1962 =

Live album by Édith Piaf
- Released: 1962
- Genre: Chanson
- Length: 42:20
- Label: Columbia

Récital 1962, also known as Olympia 1962 and A l'Olympia 1962, is an album from Édith Piaf recorded live on September 27, 1962, at L'Olympia in Paris. It was released on the Columbia label (FSX 143). Jean Leccia conducted the orchestra.

Piaf was in a weakened physical state at the time of the performance, and a doctor watched from the wings. She died the following year at age 47.

The album includes a duet on "A Quoi Ca Sert L'Amour" ("What Good Is Love?") with Théo Sarapo, a 26-year-old singer whom she married two weeks later.

== Track listing ==
Side A
No.	Title	Writer(s)	Length
1.	"Roulez Tambours"	Édith Piaf, Francis Lai	6:09
2.	"Le Diable De La Bastille"	Charles Dumont, Pierre Delanoë	2:56
3.	"Musique à Tout Va"	Francis Lai, René Rouzaud	4:06
4.	"Le Petit Brouillard"	Francis Lai, Jacques Plante	3:20
5.	"Le Droit D'Aimer"	Francis Lai, Robert Nyel	4:10

Side B
No.	Title	Writer(s)	Length
1.	"Le Billard Electrique"	Charles Dumont, Louis Poterat	3:40
2.	"Toi Tu L'Entends Pas"	Charles Dumont, Pierre Delanoë	3:07
3.	"A Quoi Ca Sert L'Amour [duet with Theo Sarapo]"	Michel Emer	3:23
4.	"Non, je ne regrette rien"	Charles Dumont, Michel Vaucaire	3:01
5.	"La Foule"	Michel Rivgauche, Angel Cabral	3:19
6.	"Milord"	Georges Moustaki, Marguerite Monnot	5:31
