= Elaine Paige: The Ultimate Collection =

The Ultimate Collection

Compilation album by Elaine Paige
- Released: 12 May 2014
- Recorded: 1978–2011
- Genre: Vocal, show tune, pop, adult contemporary, dance-pop
- Length: 77:19
- Label: Rhino UK; Warner Music UK

Elaine Paige chronology
Elaine Paige & Friends (2010)	The Ultimate Collection (2014)

The Ultimate Collection is a compilation album from Elaine Paige, released on 12 May 2014 by Rhino UK/Warner Music UK to celebrate her 50th anniversary in show business.

== Overview ==
The career-spanning retrospective features songs released between 1978 and 2011, including original hit recordings from Paige's most iconic roles in musical theatre, her favourite LP and single tracks, plus a recently commissioned remix by hit-makers Almighty. The compilation also notably features previously unreleased songs "It's Raining on Prom Night" and "What a Feeling" from the Warner Music vaults – both songs were out-takes from studio albums Paige released during the 1980s.

== Promotion ==
On 16 May 2014, Paige was a guest on the ITV breakfast show This Morning and later on the day she appeared on the Sky News channel to promote her upcoming farewell tour, The Elaine Paige Show and The Ultimate Collection. In addition to this, she gave a few interviews for the British magazines, including gay magazine The Attitude and Woman's Weekly. Information about the release of this compilation also appeared in a number of TV guides, including TV Times, Total TV Guide and TV & Satellite Week.

In June 2014, Paige appeared on the cover of Saga Magazine. The Gay Times also published an interview with her in June issue.

== Commercial performance ==
The album was released in the United Kingdom on 12 May 2014 and debuted at number 76 on the Official Albums Chart UK Top 100 with 1,225 copies sold in the first week.

== Track listing ==
The track listing for the album was announced on 9 April 2014 via Elaine Paige's official website. The standard edition has 20 tracks and was released on a single CD and worldwide via digital download.

A limited edition 2CD version was also released containing the original album plus a bonus CD of Paige's favourite A and B-side singles (released between 1980 and 2010) – the bonus CD features 4 rare singles which debuted on CD format ("Oh Major", "My Knight in Black Leather", "Rocking" and "He's a Dream").

Standard edition
No.	Title	Writer(s)	Additional	Length
1.	"Don't Cry for Me Argentina" (1978 version)	Tim Rice; Andrew Lloyd Webber	From the musical Evita	5:47
2.	"Memory" (1981 UK single version)	Andrew Lloyd Webber; Trevor Nunn; T. S. Eliot	Theme from the musical Cats	4:18
3.	"Ave Maria"	Mike Batt; Bach; Charles Gounod		3:52
4.	"I Don't Know How to Love Him"	Andrew Lloyd Webber; Tim Rice	From the musical Jesus Christ Superstar	3:55
5.	"What I Did for Love"	Edward Kleban; Marvin Hamlisch	From the musical A Chorus Line	3:32
6.	"One Night Only"	Henry Krieger; Tom Eyen	From the musical Dreamgirls	3:09
7.	"Sometimes"	Norman Newell; Carl Davis	Main theme from the film Champions	2:34
8.	"Unchained Melody"	Hy Zaret; Alex North	From the film Unchained	3:43
9.	"I Know Him So Well" (1984 UK single version with Barbara Dickson)	Björn Ulvaeus; Tim Rice; Benny Andersson	From the musical Chess	4:16
10.	"Sorry Seems to Be the Hardest Word"	Bernie Taupin; Elton John		3:33
11.	"For You"	Judie Tzuke; Mike Paxman		2:44
12.	"La Vie En Rose"	Louiguy; Édith Piaf	From the musical play Piaf	2:40
13.	"I Dreamed a Dream" (1994 live performance at the Birmingham City Hall)	Jean-Marc Natel; Herbert Kretzmer; Alain Boublil; Claude-Michel Schönberg	From the musical Les Misérables	4:25
14.	"As If We Never Said Goodbye"	Andrew Lloyd Webber; Don Black; Amy Powers; Christopher Hampton	From the musical Sunset Boulevard	5:20
15.	"With One Look"	Andrew Lloyd Webber; Don Black; Christopher Hampton; Amy Powers	From the musical Sunset Boulevard	3:28
16.	"The Prayer" (duet with Barry Manilow)	Carole Bayer Sager; David Foster		4:20
17.	"I'm Still Here"	Stephen Sondheim	From the musical Follies	5:34
18.	"It's Raining on Prom Night" (1983 out-take from Stages)	Jim Jacobs; Warren Casey	From the musical Grease	3:05
19.	"What a Feeling" (Ted Carfrae Mix – 1984 out-take from Cinema)	Giorgio Moroder; Keith Forsey; Irene Cara	From the film Flashdance	4:12
20.	"Be on Your Own" (Almighty Remix – Radio Edit])	Maury Yeston	From the musical Nine	3:05

UK 2CD Special Edition – bonus CD tracks
No.	Title	Writer(s)	Additional	Length
21.	"If You Don't Want My Love"	Phil Spector; John Prine		3:53
22.	"How the Heart Approaches What It Yearns"	Paul Simon		2:31
23.	"Far Side of the Bay"	Dave Townsend		3:34
24.	"Oh Major" (debut on CD)	Littman; Bergman		3:37
25.	"The Second Time"	Tim Rice; Francis Lai	Theme from the film Bilitis	4:08
26.	"My Knight in Black Leather" (debut on CD)	Jerry Ragovoy; Estelle Levitt		4:06
27.	"Rocking" (debut on CD)	Traditional; Arrangement by Elaine Paige and Tim Rice		2:26
28.	"Running Back for More"	Stephen Oliver; Tim Rice	From the musical Blondel	3:14
29.	"Losing My Mind"	Stephen Sondheim	From the musical Follies	3:37
30.	"Be on Your Own (original version)"	Maury Yeston	From the musical Nine	2:42
31.	"Another Suitcase in Another Hall"	Andrew Lloyd Webber; Tim Rice	From the musical Evita	3:29
32.	"The Windmills of Your Mind"	Alan Bergman; Marilyn Bergman; Michel Legrand	From the film The Thomas Crown Affair	3:15
33.	"He's a Dream" (debut on CD)	Shandy Sinnanon; Ron Magness	From the film Flashdance	3:45
34.	"Walking in the Air"	Howard Blake	From the animated film The Snowman	3:32
35.	"On My Own"	Herbert Kretzmer; Trevor Nunn; John Caird; Alain Boublil; Claude-Michel Schönberg; Jean-Marc Natel	From the musical Les Misérables	3:49
36.	"All Things Considered"	Tim Rice; Elaine Paige; Vangelis		3:41
37.	"A Winter's Tale"	Tim Rice; Mike Batt		3:58
38.	"Hymne à l'amour (If You Love Me)"	Geoffrey Parsons; Marguerite Monnot; Édith Piaf	From the musical play Piaf	2:53
39.	"The Perfect Year"	Andrew Lloyd Webber; Don Black; Christopher Hampton	From the musical Sunset Boulevard	3:20
40.	"It's Only Life" (duet with Sinéad O'Connor)	Tim Rice; Gary Barlow		4:10

== Personnel ==
Credits adapted from the liner notes of the standard edition of The Ultimate Collection.

- Elaine Paige – lead vocals, executive producer of compilation
- Stuart Wheeley – Rhino project management
- Stephen Munns – compilation producer
- Jessica Bound – project assistant
- Kathy Kelly – licensing
- Stephen Munns – artwork direction
- Johnathan Elliott of Mental Block – artwork design
- Redlight Studios – mastering
- Stephen Munns, Clair Corbey & Seb Lassandro – research
- Michael Childers – photography
- Tony Visconti – record producer (track 4–8, 10, 11, 18–20)
- Andrew Lloyd Webber and Tim Rice – record producers (track 1)
- Andrew Lloyd Webber – record producer (track 2)
- Mike Batt – record producer (track 3)
- Benny Andersson, Tim Rice & Björn Ulvaeus – record producers (track 9)
- Mike Moran – record producer (track 12)
- Anthony Pugh – record producer (track 13)
- Andrew Lloyd Webber and Nigel Wright – record producers (track 14 & 15)
- Phil Ramone and Barry Manilow – record producers (track 16)
- Tommy Krasker and Philip Chaffin – record producers (track 17)
- Ted Carfrae – mix engineer (track 19)
- Almighty – additional production and remix (track 20)

== Release history ==
Region	Date	Format(s)	Label	Ref		
United Kingdom	12 May 2014	CD; digital download; Special 2CD Edition	Rhino UK; Warner Music UK			
United States	12 May 2014	CD; digital download; Special 2CD Edition	Rhino UK; Warner Music UK	20 May 2014	CD; digital download; Special 2CD Edition	Rhino; Warner Music
