= From a Distance (disambiguation) =

From a Distance may refer to:

- "From a Distance", song by Julie Gold, made famous by Nanci Griffith and Bette Midler
- "From a Distance", song by P. F. Sloan
- "From a Distance", song by Roxette
- From a Distance: The Very Best of Nanci Griffith, album by Nanci Griffith
- From a Distance: The Event, album by Cliff Richard
- From a Distance (Elaine Paige album), album by Elaine Paige

see also

- Death from a Distance, 1935 American film directed by Frank R. Strayer
- "Touching from a Distance, biography by Deborah Curtis about Ian Curtis, lead singer of Joy Division
