= Christmas (Elaine Paige album) =

Studio album by Elaine Paige
- Released: 17 November 1986
- Recorded: September 1986 at Good Earth Studios, London
- Genre: Christmas
- Label: WEA
- Producer: Tony Visconti

Elaine Paige chronology
| Love Hurts (1985) | Christmas (1986) | Memories: The Best Of Elaine Paige (1987) |

Christmas is an album by Elaine Paige, released in 1986, the fifth and final album to be released on the label until the release of Piaf in 1994. The album reached number 27 in the UK album charts. The album was re-issued on CD in 2006.

It was the fourth and last of Paige's albums to be produced by Tony Visconti, after Stage (1983), Cinema (1984) and Love Hurts (1985).

The album was recorded at Visconti's Good Earth Studios in September 1986. In contrast to Paige's musical theatre background, a feature of all her Visconti-produced recordings is the pop arrangements. "Ave Maria" had been recorded and released as a single in 1982, it was also included on the 2-CD set Save The Children - Christmas Carols and Festive Songs in 1988. "A Winter's Tale" was written by Wombles producer Mike Batt and Paige's then partner, lyricist Tim Rice and had been originally recorded by David Essex. Rice also contributed a voiceover as Santa on the final track. Tommy Körberg who, in 1986, was starring alongside Paige in the London production of Chess performed the Bing Crosby part on "Peace On Earth/Little Drummer Boy".

The album cover artwork featured Paige in a fake fur stole decorated with mistletoe. The reverse cover showed another 12 shots from the photoshoot where Paige makes a variety of humorous poses.

== Track listing ==
1. "Walking in the Air" - 3.29 (Howard Blake)
2. "Peace on Earth" - 3.01 (Buz Kohan, Larry Grossman, Ian Fraser) / The Little Drummer Boy (Harry Simeone, Henry V. Onorati, Katherine K. Davis)
3. "The Little Drummer Boy"
4. "Father Christmas Eyes" - 4.36 (Julia Downes, Johnny Warman, Don Black)
5. "Ave Maria" - 3.52 (Charles Gounod)
6. "Wishin' On a Star" - 3.52 (Billie Calvin)
7. "Santa Claus is Coming to Town" - 2.50 (Haven Gillespie, J. Fred Coots)
8. "Coventry Carol" - 2.28 (Traditional)
9. "The Coldest Night of the Year (Incredible Phat)" - 4.45 (Jimmy Webb)
10. "Light of the Stable" - 3.06 (Steve Rhymer, Elizabeth Rhymer)
11. "I Believe in Father Christmas" - 3.28 (Greg Lake, Peter Sinfield)
12. "A Winter's Tale" - 3.58 (Mike Batt, Tim Rice)
13. "Thirty-Two Feet and Eight Little Tails" - 0.51 (John Redmond, James Cavanaugh, Frank Weldon)

== Personnel ==
=== Musicians ===
- Elaine Paige - vocals
- Mel Collins - tenor saxophone
- Mitch Dalton - guitars
- Mary Hopkin - backing vocals
- Mini Pops (Richard Agg, Kelly East, Paul Hardy, Zoe Hart, Robin Wilson, Jessica Visconti) - backing vocals
- Steve Pearce - bass guitar
- Tim Rice - Santa voiceover on "Thirty-Two Feet and Eight Little Tails"
- Robin Smith - musical director, keyboards
- Ali Thomson - backing vocals
- Graham Ward - drums
- Mari Wilson - backing vocals

The Astarte Orchestra was led by Gavyn Wright

=== Production ===
- Producer and Mixer - Tony Visconti
- Mixer - Sid Wells
- Assistant Engineer - Sam Smith
- Orchestral Arrangements and "Coventry Carol" Arrangement - Robin Smith
- Strings Arrangements - Tony Visconti
- "Ave Maria" Producer and Arranger - Mike Batt

== Charts ==
| Chart (1986) | Peak position |
|---|---|
| UK Albums (OCC) | 27 |

== Certifications and sales ==
| Region | Certification | Certified units/sales |
|---|---|---|
| United Kingdom (BPI) | Gold | 100,000^{^} |
^{^} Shipments figures based on certification alone.
