= Piaf (album) =

Studio album by Elaine Paige
- Released: 7 November 1994
- Label: Warner Music Group
- Producer: Mike Moran

Elaine Paige chronology
Romance & the Stage (1993)	Piaf (1994)	Elaine Paige (1995)

Piaf is the title of an album released by Elaine Paige in 1994.

It consists of a number of covers of songs originally recorded by Édith Piaf and was released to coincide with Paige's appearance in Pam Gems' biographical play Piaf in London.

The album was recorded at Master Rock, Olympic, Maison Rouge, Imagination and Lansdowne Studios. It was mixed at Master Rock.

It was released by Warner Music UK on the WEA label. It peaked at #46 on the UK Albums Chart and stayed on the chart for six weeks.

== Track listing ==
1. "Hymne à l'amour (If You Love Me)" – 2:52 (Marguerite Monnot/Edith Piaf/Geoffrey Parsons)
2. "C'est à Hambourg (Harbour Girl)" – 4:00 (Charles Dumont/Edith Piaf/Pam Gems/Adrian Mitchell)
3. "La Vie en rose" – 2:40 (Louiguy/Edith Piaf)
4. "La Goualante du pauvre Jean (The Ballad of Poor Old John)" – 1:44 (Marguerite Monnot/Rene Rouzard/Adrian Mitchell)
5. "Les Trois Cloches (The Three Bells)" – 3:53 (Jean Villard/Bert Reisfeld)
6. "Mon Dieu" – 3:46 (Charles Dumont/Michel Vaucaire)
7. "Les Amants d'un Jour (Lovers for a Day)" – 3:17 (Marguerite Monnot/Jacques Delecluse/Michelle Senlis/Pam Gems/Adrian Mitchell)
8. "La Belle Histoire d'amour" – 4:18 (Charles Dumont/Edith Piaf/Adrian Mitchell)
9. "Je sais comment (All This I Know)" – 3:29 (Julien Bouquet/Robert Chauvigny/Norman Newell/Hal Shaper)
10. "Non, je ne regrette rien" – 3:42 (Charles Dumont/Edith Piaf)
11. "L'Accordeoniste (The Accordionist)" – 4:03 (E. Emer/Adrian Mitchell)

== Production credits ==
Role	Contributor
Producer	Mike Moran
Arrangements	Del Newman, Mike Moran
Musical Director	Del Newman, Laurie Holloway, Mike Moran
Recording and mixing engineer	Tony Taverner
Assistant Engineers	James Brown, David Browne (Master Rock), Chris Bandy (Olympic), David Tyler (Maison Rouge)
Additional engineering	Larry Bartlett (Imagination)
Digital Editing	Bob Butterworth, Tony Cousins
Mastering Engineer	Tony Cousins (Metropolis)

== Musicians ==
Role	Contributor
Drums	Brett Morgan
Bass	Trevor Barry
Accordion	Jack Emblow
Cello	Tony Pleeth
Leader / Violin	Jack Rothstein
Piano	Laurie Holloway
PIano / Fender Rhodes	Mike Moran
Orchestral Contractor	David Katz
Singers	Andy Busher, Steve Butler, Phil Nicholl, Lindsay Benson

== Other credits ==
Role	Contributor
French Coach	Michel Vallat
Art Direction	Rob Dickins
Photography	David Scheinmann
Sleeve Design	Sooky
Stylist	Christopher Lawrence-Price
Make-up	Nikki Whelan
Personal Management	Deke Arlon for D & J Arlon Enterprises Ltd

== Certifications and sales ==
Region	Certification	Certified units/sales
United Kingdom (BPI)	Silver	60,000^{^}
^{^} Shipments figures based on certification alone.
