= Cora Vaucaire =

French singer (1918–2011)

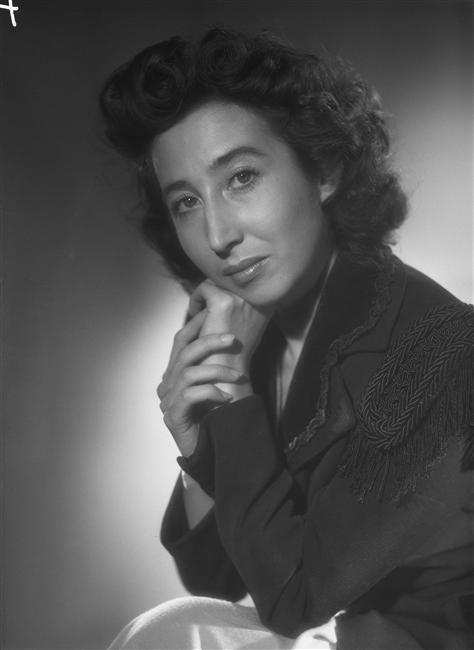
- Born: Geneviève Marguerite Collin; 22 July 1918; Marseille, France
- Died: 17 September 2011 (aged 93); Paris, France
- Spouse: Michel Vaucaire

Geneviève Marguerite Collin (1918–2011), known by the name Cora Vaucaire, was a French singer.

Geneviève Collin was born 12 July 1918, in Marseille. Against her family's wishes, she attended the Conservatoire d'art dramatique de Paris, where she studied under French actor Fernand Ledoux and director Charles Dullin. Despite winning a local prize for comedy and tragedy at age 16, she experienced stage fright during her first performance at the Sarah Bernhardt Theatre.

During the Occupation, Collin married the lyricist and musicologist Michel Vaucaire, who encouraged her to sing. Her first performances were over the radio, where she began to overcome her stage fright. Over time, she sang with many popular artists. In the 1980s, she became the first French singer to perform in Albania.

Vaucaire died in Paris on 17 September 2011.
