= Oceanic Feeling (album) =

Studio album by The Prayer Boat
- Released: 1991
- Label: BMG/RCA

The Prayer Boat chronology
Oceanic Feeling (1991)	Polichinelle (2001)

Oceanic Feeling is The Prayer Boat's first full-length album, released in 1991 on BMG/RCA records.

The term "oceanic feeling" is a psychoanalytic term for the spiritual feeling of limitlessness.

== Track listing ==
1. "Stopping The World" – 3:43
2. "Oceanic Feeling" – 5:03
3. "Millionaire Hero" – 4:00
4. "Don't Make Me Breathe You In" – 3:17
5. "Love and Possession" – 5:44
6. "Upside Down" – 3:18
7. "Out of Mind" – 5:36
8. "Still Only One" – 4:18
9. "Hunger For The Beautiful" – 6:36
10. "Mercy" – 10:36
11. "Among Madmen" – 4:19
