= Elaine Paige in Concert =

Elaine Paige in Concert was a video recording of a concert performance at Birmingham Symphony Hall, which was part of Elaine Paige's 1991 UK tour.

The set list featured songs from her musical theatre, as well as a number of tracks from her 1991 album Love Can Do That.

== Track listing ==
1. "I Have Dreamed" (Richard Rodgers/Oscar Hammerstein II)
2. "Anything Goes" (Cole Porter)
3. "Love Can Do That" (Diane Warren)
4. "Another Suitcase in Another Hall" (Tim Rice/Andrew Lloyd Webber)
5. "Heart Don't Change My Mind" (Robbie Buchanan/Diane Warren)
6. "The Rose" (Amanda McBroom)
7. "Oxygen" (Nik Kershaw)
8. "Love Hurts" (Boudleaux Bryant)
9. "Bohemian Rhapsody" (Freddie Mercury)
10. "One Night in Bangkok" (Benny Andersson/Björn Ulvaeus/Tim Rice)
11. "He's Out of My Life" (Tom Bahler)
12. "True Colours" (Billy Steinberg/Tom Kelly)
13. "Radio Ga Ga" (Roger Taylor)
14. "What'll I Do/Who" (Irving Berlin/Jerome Kern/Otto Harbach/Oscar Hammerstein II)
15. "I Only Have Eyes for You" (Al Dubin/Harry Warren)
16. "Well Almost" (Mike Chapman/Holly Knight)
17. "Don't Cry for Me Argentina" (Tim Rice/Andrew Lloyd Webber)
18. "I Know Him So Well" (Benny Andersson/Björn Ulvaeus/Tim Rice)
19. "Memory" (Andrew Lloyd Webber/T. S. Eliot/Trevor Nunn)

== Musicians ==
- Elaine Paige - vocals
- Ian Wherry - musical director, keyboards
- Pete Zorn - guitar

== Production credits ==
- Producer and director - John G. Smith
- Executive producer - Deke Arlon
- Soundtrack mixers - Ian Wherry, Bill Tansley and Peter Jones
