= Mon Dieu =

1960 song by Édith Piaf

"Mon Dieu" (My God in French) is a 1960 song by Édith Piaf. The lyrics are by Michel Vaucaire and the music is by Charles Dumont. Édith Piaf sang this song originally in French, but recorded it in English as well. The song has been sung by many other singers, such as Mireille Mathieu.

== Background ==
The French journalist Jean Noli tells in his book "Edith" (Stock, 1973) the story about this song written by Charles Dumont and Michel Vaucaire. The story behind is that Dumont for a long time had tried to make Piaf interested in his compositions, but she had turned him down. She considered his songs too mediocre. But that changed after he had offered her "Non, je ne regrette rien". In the middle of the night he was sent to Piaf's home. She wanted the Olympia-boss Bruno Coquatrix to listen to that song, and even Coquatrix was conquered. "Do you have another song?", Piaf asked Dumont. "Yes, he answered, but I don't know if it suits you." "I'll listen to you. At last we'll listen to you.", said Piaf.

He played it and sang the words. When he had finished there was a short silence."The music is very beautiful, but the text is completely impossible. What is the name of the song?", Piaf asked. "Toulon-Le Havre-Anvers", answered Dumont. "Grotesque", said Piaf. "Completely ridiculous and stupid. Who wrote this?" - "Michel Vaucaire". So in the middle of the night Piaf called Vaucaire and said that she wanted him to write a new text and bring it to her 17-o'clock next day. He arrived on time, gave a paper to Charles Dumont who played it and sang it.

When he was ready Piaf applauded, her face was radiant: The sailor song "Toulon-Le Havre-Anvers" had become "Mon Dieu".

== Cover versions ==
• Elaine Paige covered the song on her 1994 album Piaf. • Mireille Mathieu covered the song on her 1990 album Ce soir je t'ai perdu. • Patricia Kaas covered the song on her 2012 album Kaas chante Piaf.
