= Polichinelle (album) =

Studio album by The Prayer Boat
- Released: March 20, 2001
- Label: Invisible, Atlantic, Setanta

The Prayer Boat chronology
Oceanic Feeling (1991)	Polichinelle (2001)

Polichinelle is the second studio album by Irish quartet The Prayer Boat, released on May 8, 2000 on Atlantic and Setanta.

The album received a two-star rating from AllMusic. Hot Press described it as "an album of rare beauty, a truly wonderful, warm and sincere hoard of gems, performed with a passion and talent which is unique to the Blessington quartet." Billboard, noting that the band was "not likely to perform well against" current performers, remarked, "Still, Polichinelle has the sweet pop melodies that should tickle mainstream ears."

== Track listing ==
No.	Title	Length
1.	"Polichinelle"	4:37
2.	"Saved"	4:22
3.	"It Hurts To Lose You"	5:12
4.	"Dead Flowers"	4:37
5.	"Balance"	3:59
6.	"Soon The Stars Will Steer Me"	4:21
7.	"Dark Green"	4:11
8.	"Paralysed"	4:21
9.	"Was This Love"	4:51
10.	"In My Arms Again"	5:06
