= Elaine Paige (album) =

Studio album by Elaine Paige
- Released: 13 November 1981
- Recorded: 1980; Air Studios, London
- Genre: MOR
- Length: 39:08
- Label: WEA
- Producer: Tim Rice, Andrew Powell

Elaine Paige chronology
Sitting Pretty (1978)	Elaine Paige (1981)	Stages (1983)

Elaine Paige is the second solo album from Elaine Paige, released in 1981. The album charted at no. 56 in May 1982 and was re-issued on CD in 1995 by Warner Music. The recording was produced by Tim Rice and Andrew Powell. Paige had met Rice when she was cast as Eva Perón in the original stage production of his musical Evita in 1978. He also wrote lyrics for a number of the tracks on the album. Rice's former writing partner Andrew Lloyd Webber wrote the arrangement of the track "The Second Time", for which Rice had set words to Francis Lai's theme to the film Bilitis.

The track "Secrets" was originally written for the Barbra Streisand album Guilty, but didn't make it on to the final record.

Soon after completing recording of the album, Paige stepped into the role of Grizabella in the musical Cats very soon before its opening night after Judi Dench, who was to have played the role, damaged her Achilles tendon during rehearsals.

== Track listing ==
1. "If You Don't Want My Love" - 3:35 (Phil Spector, John Prine)
2. "Far Side of the Bay" - 3:30 (Dave Townsend)
3. "So Sad (To Watch Good Love Go Bad)" - 3:10 (Don Everly)
4. "Secrets" - 3:45 (Barry Gibb, Robin Gibb)
5. "I Want to Marry You" - 3:40 (Florrie Palmer)
6. "The Second Time (Theme from Bilitis)" - 4:06 (Francis Lai, Tim Rice)
7. "The Last One to Leave" - 2:46 (Florrie Palmer, Tim Rice)
8. "Hot as Sun" - 3:15 (Paul McCartney, Tim Rice)
9. "Falling Down to Earth" - 4:07 (Mike Batt, Tim Rice)
10. "How the Heart Approaches What It Yearns" - 2:26 (Paul Simon)
11. "Miss My Love Today" - 3:45 (Gilbert O'Sullivan)

== Personnel ==
- Elaine Paige - vocals
- Ian Bairnson - bass, guitar
- Mike Moran - keyboards
- Chris Rainbow - backing vocals
- Stuart Elliott - drums
- Andrew Powell - arranger
- John Kelly - engineer

== Certifications and sales ==
Region	Certification	Certified units/sales
United Kingdom (BPI)	Silver	60,000^{^}
^{^} Shipments figures based on certification alone.
