= The Elaine Paige Show =

- Presented by: Elaine Paige
- Country of origin: United Kingdom
- Original language: English
- No. of series: 1
- No. of episodes: 6

Production
- Producer: Sky Arts
- Running time: 60 minutes

Original release
- Network: Sky Arts
- Release: 14 May – 21 June 2014

The Elaine Paige Show is a British six-part music and chat show hosted by Elaine Paige that was broadcast by Sky Arts in 2014.

It was recorded at Riverside Studios, London and featured musical performances by Paige and guests performers from musical theatre. She also conducted masterclasses with students studying at Mountview Academy of Theatre Arts, London, and interviewed her guests.

Episode	Original Broadcast Date	Guests	Songs Performed by Paige
1	14 May 2014	Julian Ovenden; Leigh Zimmerman; Gillian Lynne	"Magic to Do"; "Hymne A L'Amour (If You Love Me)"
2	21 May 2014	Tim Rice; Michael Feinstein; Douglas Hodge	"Don't Cry for Me Argentina"; "Nobody's Side"
3	31 May 2014	Maureen Lipman; Hannah Waddingham; Clive Rowe; Christine Andreas	"Everybody Says Don't"; "With One Look"
4	7 June 2014	Trevor Nunn; Herbert Kretzmer; Scarlett Strallen (who performs "Til There Was You")	"Bring Him Home"; "Memory"
5	11 June 2014	Andrew Lloyd Webber; Alexander Hanson (who performs "Pilate's Dream")	
6	21 June 2014	Clips from the previous five episodes	
