= Love Hurts (Elaine Paige album) =

Studio album by Elaine Paige
- Released: 4 November 1985
- Recorded: 1985
- Studio: Good Earth (London)
- Genres: Pop; rock
- Label: WEA
- Producer: Tony Visconti

Elaine Paige chronology
Cinema (1984)	Love Hurts (1985)	Christmas (1986)

Love Hurts is the fifth solo studio album by the English singer Elaine Paige, released in 1985, on the Warner Music label. The album peaked at number eight in the UK Albums Chart. Originally released on vinyl record and cassette, the album was later released on CD.

It was the third of Paige's recordings to be produced by Tony Visconti, after Stages in 1983 and Cinema in 1984, and was recorded at his Good Earth Studios in London.

With this album, Paige returned to mainstream pop and moved away from her previous two themed albums. Only one song was taken from her musical theatre career: "I Know Him So Well", which had been released as a single in 1984, reaching number one in the UK singles chart in early 1985. It was recorded as a duet with Barbara Dickson for the Chess musical concept album. Paige collaborated with Tim Rice on the lyrics for "All Things Considered", which were set to a melody by Vangelis.

The album includes Paige's cover of the ballad Shaking You, which was originally written for and performed by Olivia Newton-John for the soundtrack of the 1983 movie Two Of A Kind.

== Track listing ==
1. "Love Hurts" - 4.59 (Boudleaux Bryant)
2. "Sorry Seems to Be the Hardest Word" - 3.29 (Elton John, Bernie Taupin)
3. "This Is Where I Came In" - 3.41 (Wendy Waldman, Phil Galdston)
4. "All Things Considered" - 3.39 (Vangelis, Tim Rice, Elaine Paige)
5. "MacArthur Park" - 6.46 (Jimmy Webb)
6. "For You" - 2.45 (Judie Tzuke, Mike Paxman),
7. "My Man and Me" - 4.15 (Andy Hill, Frank Musker)
8. "Without You" - 3.15 (Pete Ham, Tom Evans)
9. "The Apple Tree" - 4.00 (Chris Difford, Glenn Tilbrook)
10. "Shaking You" - 3.50 (Paul Gordon, David Foster, Tom Keane)
11. "I Know Him So Well" (Elaine Paige and Barbara Dickson) - 4.14 (Benny Andersson, Tim Rice, Björn Ulvaeus)

== Personnel ==
=== Musicians ===
- Elaine Paige – vocals
- Derek Bramble – bass guitar
- Hugh Burns – guitar
- Andy Duncan – drums
- Michael J. Mullins – backing vocals
- Ray Russell – guitar
- Robin Smith – keyboards, backing vocals
- Barbara Thompson – saxophone
- Tony Visconti – banjo, recorders, backing vocals
- Graham Ward – drums

The Mark Peterson Singers and The London Community Gospel Choir also appeared. The Astarte Session Orchestra was led by Gavyn Wright.

=== Production ===
- Producer – Tony Visconti
- Assistant engineer – Gordon Futter
- "The Apple Tree" assistant engineer – Chris Porter
- Orchestrations – Robin Smith
- Programming – Tony Visconti

== Certifications and sales ==
Region	Certification	Certified units/sales
United Kingdom (BPI)	Platinum	300,000^{^}
^{^} Shipments figures based on certification alone.
