= Memories: The Best of Elaine Paige =

Memories: The Best Of Elaine Paige

Compilation album by Elaine Paige
- Released: 1987
- Recorded: Good Earth Studios, London, 1981–1987
- Genre: Pop, rock
- Label: WEA
- Producer: Tony Visconti

Elaine Paige chronology
Christmas (1986)	Memories: The Best Of Elaine Paige (1987)	The Queen Album (1988)

Memories: The Best Of Elaine Paige is a compilation album by Elaine Paige, released in 1987, on the Warner Music label.

This album covers Elaine Paige's career at WEA from 1981 up until 1986, with tracks from all of her five albums recorded for the label. Most notable is the inclusion of one track that was previously unreleased "On My Own", from the musical Les Misérables which was produced by Tony Visconti. The album charted in 1988 at number 14 in the UK albums chart.

== Track listing ==
1. "Memory" - 4.09 (Andrew Lloyd Webber/T.S. Eliot/Trevor Nunn)
2. "I Don't Know How to Love Him" - 3.50 (Andrew Lloyd Webber/Tim Rice)
3. "Love Hurts" - 4.59 (Boudleaux Bryant)
4. "The Second Time (Theme from Bilitis)" - 4.06 (Francis Lai/Tim Rice)
5. "The Windmills of Your Mind" - 3.15 (Michel Legrand/Alan Bergman/Marilyn Bergman)
6. "Tomorrow" - 2.42 (Martin Charnin/Charles Strouse)
7. "On My Own" - 3.48 (Claude-Michel Schönberg, Alain Boublil, Herbert Kretzmer, Jean-Marc Natel, Trevor Nunn) (Previously unreleased recording)
8. "I Know Him So Well" (Benny Andersson, Tim Rice, Bjorn Ulvaeus)
9. "The Way We Were" - 4.00 (Alan Bergman/Marilyn Bergman/Marvin Hamlisch)
10. "The Rose" - 3.45 (Amanda McBroom)
11. "Walking in the Air" - 3.29 (Howard Blake)
12. "If You Don't Want My Love" - 3.35 (Phil Spector/John Prine)
13. "For You" - 4.00 (Judie Tzuke/Mike Paxman)
14. "Missing" - 3.55 (Vangelis/Tim Rice)
15. "Another Suitcase in Another Hall" - 3.23 (Andrew Lloyd Webber/Tim Rice)
16. "Don't Cry for Me Argentina" - 5.38 (Andrew Lloyd Webber/Tim Rice)

== Certifications and sales ==
Region	Certification	Certified units/sales
United Kingdom (BPI)	Platinum	300,000^{^}
^{^} Shipments figures based on certification alone.
