= Graham Ward (musician) =

American drummer

Graham Ward is a British drummer, arranger, writer and record producer. He started his playing career at 14 with the UK's NYJO before taking up the drum chair in the London production of Cats (1981). He has played and toured with Paul McCartney, Elaine Paige, Paul Young, the Pussycat Dolls, Tom Jones, Murray Head, Nick Heyward, Fred Durst, the Wu-Tang Clan, Tokio Hotel, and N8N. He has lived in London and L.A. and is currently based in Cape Town where he runs his own production company, Wardwide-Music.

== Career ==
In 1983, on which he played drums on the album Stages by Elaine Paige, he would later perform on three other albums with her, and in 1986, he performed on former Beatle Paul McCartney's Press to Play. He also performed on the album Other Voices by Paul Young, and on Doll Domination by the Pussycat Dolls.

Ward currently resides in Cape Town, South Africa, and works under his own audio production company by the name of Wardwide Music.
