= Elaine Paige and Friends =

Studio album by Elaine Paige
- Released: 1 November 2010

Elaine Paige chronology
Elaine Paige Live (2009)	Elaine Paige and Friends (2010)

Elaine Paige and Friends is a duet album from Elaine Paige, released on 1 November 2010. Phil Ramone produced the album for Rhino/Warner Bros Records. The CD debuted on the UK Album Chart at #18. Paige toured the UK in concert promoting the recording in the beginning of 2011. The CD sold "more than 100,000 units and earned Gold certification from the BPI", as of 20 December 2010.

== Track listing ==
Source:Playbill and AllMusic

1. "Mi Morena" – with Jon Secada (sax solo by Kenny G)
2. "Take a Bow" – with Idina Menzel
3. "The Prayer" – with Barry Manilow
4. "Just the Way You Are" – with Paul Anka
5. "The Closest Thing to Crazy" – with LeAnn Rimes (string arrangement by Mike Batt)
6. "Where Is the Love" – with John Barrowman
7. "It's Only Life" – with Sinéad O'Connor
8. "You Are Everything" – with Billy Ocean
9. "It Might Be You" – with Johnny Mathis
10. "Amoureuse" – with Olivia Newton-John
11. "Make It with You" – with Neil Sedaka
12. "All the Way" – with Michael Bolton
13. "Thank You for Being a Friend" – with Dionne Warwick

== Review ==
AllMusic review wrote "Phil Ramone's clean and simple production perfectly complements Paige's sweet but powerful vocal ability. Elaine Paige and Friends is unlikely to echo the multi-platinum success of similar duets collections, but for fans who've waited nearly 20 years for new material, it's a tasteful and well-produced choice of songs."
