= Cinema (Elaine Paige album) =

1984 album

Studio album by Elaine Paige
- Released: 12 October 1984
- Recorded: Good Earth (London)
- Genre: Pop, rock
- Label: WEA & K-tel
- Producer: Tony Visconti

Elaine Paige chronology
Stages (1983)	Cinema (1984)	Love Hurts (1985)

Cinema is the fourth solo album by the English singer Elaine Paige, released in 1984 on Warner Music. It peaked at number 12 in the UK Albums Chart and was the 39th best selling album of the year in the UK.

== Background ==
For her previous album Stages (1983), Paige had chosen tracks from musical theatre. Following this theme, Cinema features songs that had been previously recorded for film soundtracks.

Tim Rice wrote lyrics to Vangelis's theme for the film Missing specifically for this album.

== Production ==
Cinema was the second of Paige's recordings to be produced by Tony Visconti.

Like Stages, the recording was primarily conducted at Visconti's Good Earth Studios, other than for "Sometimes" (Theme from Champions) which had been previously recorded at CTS Studios in London, featuring the New World Philharmonia.

== Out-takes ==
In 2014, Rhino UK released the compilation album Elaine Paige: The Ultimate Collection which includes the out-take "What a Feeling" (from the film Flashdance), originally recorded as part of the Cinema album sessions.

== Track listing ==
1. "The Windmills of Your Mind" - 3.15 (Michel Legrand, Alan Bergman, Marilyn Bergman) - from the film The Thomas Crown Affair
2. "Out Here On My Own" - 3.50 (Lesley Gore, Michael Gore) - from the film Fame
3. "Prisoner (Love Theme from 'The Eyes of Laura Mars')" - 4.30 (Karen Lawrence, John Desautels) - from the film The Eyes of Laura Mars
4. "Sometimes" - 2.34 (Norman Newell, Carl Davis) - from the film Champions
5. "Theme from Mahogany (Do You Know Where You're Going To)" - 3.40 (Michael Masser, Gerry Goffin) - from the film Mahogany
6. "Up Where We Belong" - 4.18 (Will Jennings, Buffy Sainte-Marie, Jack Nitzsche) - from the film An Officer and a Gentleman
7. "Unchained Melody" - 3.43 (Hy Zaret, Alex North) - from the film Unchained
8. "Bright Eyes" - 3.50 (Mike Batt) - from the film Watership Down
9. "Alfie" - 2.51 (Hal David, Burt Bacharach) - from the film Alfie
10. "Missing" - 3.55 (Vangelis, Tim Rice) - from the film Missing
11. "The Way We Were" - 4.10 (Edward Kleban, Marvin Hamlisch) - from the film The Way We Were
12. "The Rose" - 3.45 (Amanda McBroom) - from the film The Rose

== Personnel ==
=== Musicians ===
- Elaine Paige – vocals
- Ian Bairnson – slide guitar
- Derek Bramble – bass guitar
- Vicki Brown – backing vocals
- Simon Chamberlain – piano
- Phil Cranham – bass guitar
- Mitch Dalton – guitars
- Andy Duncan – drums
- Herbie Flowers – bass
- Sue Glove – backing vocals
- Luis Jardim – percussion
- Sunny Leslie – backing vocals
- Barry Morgan – drums
- Robin Smith – keyboards, piano, backing vocals
- Tony Visconti – guitar, backing vocals
- Graham Ward – drums
- Ray Warleigh – saxophone

=== Production ===
- Producer and mixer – Tony Visconti
- Assistant engineers – Sven Taits and Rob Trillo
- "Sometimes" engineer – David Hunt
- "Sometimes" assistant engineer – Tim Pennington
- Rhythm and string arrangements – Robin Smith
- Woodwind and orchestral arrangements – Tony Visconti
- "Sometimes" orchestral leader – David Katz

== Charts ==
Chart (1984–85)	Peak position
Australia (Kent Music Report)	35
United Kingdom (Official Charts)	12

== Certifications and sales ==
Region	Certification	Certified units/sales
United Kingdom (BPI)	Platinum	300,000^{^}
^{^} Shipments figures based on certification alone.
