= Michel Vaucaire =

French lyricist

Michel Vaucaire (3 August 1904 in Brissago, Switzerland – 18 June 1980 in Saint-Denis) was a French lyricist.

He often collaborated with the composer Charles Dumont, in whom he always had confidence to put his lyrics to music. He is perhaps best known as the author of "Non, je ne regrette rien" ("No, I regret nothing"), written in 1956, with its most notable recording completed in 1960 by singer Edith Piaf.

Dumont tells in the book Édith Piaf, Opinions publiques, by Bernard Marchois (TF1 Editions 1995), that Vaucaire's original title was "Non, je ne trouverai rien" (No, I will not find anything) and that the song was meant for the popular French singer Rosalie Dubois. But, thinking of Édith, he changed the title to "Non, je ne regrette rien" (No, I Regret Nothing).

According to journalist Jean Noli, in his book Édith (Éditions Stock 1973), when Dumont and Vaucaire visited Piaf's home at Boulevard Lannes in Paris on 24 October 1960, she received them in a very impolite and unfriendly manner. Dumont had several times tried to offer Piaf his compositions, but she disliked them and had refused them – the standard was too low, according to her. On that day she was furious that her housekeeper Danielle had arranged a meeting with the two men without informing her. So she let them wait an hour in her living room before she appeared. "As you can see I am extremely tired", she said to them, very irritated. "Hurry up, only one song! Quick to the piano, go ahead!" she commanded. Nervous and perspiring, Dumont sang the song in a low voice. When he finished there was a big silence, as they waited for Piaf's verdict. "Will you sing it again?" asked Piaf in a sharp voice. When he was hardly halfway through, she interrupted him. "Formidable! [Fantastic!]" she exclaimed. "Formidable. This is the song I have been waiting for. It will be my biggest success! I want it for my coming performance at L'Olympia!" Vaucaire, delighted, replied, "Of course, Édith, the song is yours".

Piaf dedicated her recording of the song to the French Foreign Legion. At the time of the recording, France was engaged in a military conflict, the Algerian War (1954–1962), and the 1st Foreign Parachute Regiment—which backed the failed 1961 putsch against president Charles de Gaulle and the civilian leadership of Algeria—adopted the song when their resistance was broken. The leadership of the Regiment was arrested and tried but the non-commissioned officers, corporals and Legionnaires were assigned to other Foreign Legion formations. They left the barracks singing the song, which has now become part of the French Foreign Legion heritage and is sung when they are on parade.

Vaucaire and Dumont wrote a song about the Berlin Wall, which had just gone up, called Le mur, intended for Piaf. After she died, they heard Barbra Streisand wanted it for an album of French-based songs, and the story is they refused to let any French performers sing it until after Streisand's decision and performance. In 1966 Barbra Streisand released her 8th album, Je m'appelle Barbra, with Le mur on it, sung all in French. Most of the songs on the Je m'appelle Barbra album were conducted by Michel Legrand, the first time Streisand and Legrand worked together. Later, an American lyricist, Earl Shuman, wrote an English-language version titled "I've Been Here." That song, though is not a translation of Le mur but a completely different song that just uses Dumont's Bolero-style music. "I've Been Here" was recorded separately and was on the "B" side of a 45 rpm., with "Free Again" on the "A" side The label cites Shuman, Vaucaire and Dumont as the authors/composers, although Vaucaire had nothing to do with this version.

Michel Vaucaire was the husband of Genevieve Collin, better known under the name of Cora Vaucaire, “the white lady of Saint-Germain-of-Meadows”.
