= Jean Noli =

Italian-born writer (1928–2000)

- Born: 1928; Genoa, Italy
- Died: 8 May 2000 (aged 71–72); Paris, France
- Occupations: Novelist; Journalist
- Years active: 1970–1996

Jean Noli (Giovanni Paolo Sergio Noli) (1928 in Genoa – 8 May 2000 in Paris) was a French-speaking writer and journalist of Italian origin.

== Biography ==
Jean Noli (Giovanni Paolo Sergio Noli) resided for a long time in France, dividing his time between Paris and the Breton island of Hoëdic. He is known to have written a biography of Edith Piaf. Several of his novels are inspired by the sea and the Breton islands. He has been a co-author of books on sailors Olivier de Kersauson, Michel Malinovsky and Éric Tabarly.

The island of Hoëdic is the site of his novel La Grâce de Dieu, which earned him the 1978 prix des libraires.

As a journalist and rewriter, Jean Noli collaborated for several years in the weekly VSD from its inception in 1977.

== Work ==
- 1970: Les Loups de l'Amiral, Fayard
- 1971: Le Choix — prix Broquette-Gonin
- 1977: La Grâce de Dieu — Julliard, ISBN 2260000819 prix des libraires
- 1980: La Banquière, J'ai lu, ISBN 2277211540
- 1981: Larguez les mémoires, Éditions maritimes et d'outre-mer
- 1985: La Mariée de l'ombre, Plon, ISBN 2259014003
- 1986: Vengeance
- 1991: Mor Bihan
- 1993: Piaf secrète
- 1996: Chers Italiens, Éditions de Fallois, ISBN 978-2877062794

In collaboration with Olivier de Kersauson:

- 1979: Fortune de mer
- 1994: Homme libre... toujours tu chériras la mer !
