= Romance & the Stage =

Studio album by Elaine Paige
- Released: 29 March 1993
- Recorded: CTS Studios, London
- Genre: Pop
- Length: 46:38
- Label: RCA
- Producer: Peter Matz

Elaine Paige chronology
An Evening With Elaine Paige (1991)	Romance & the Stage (1993)	Piaf (1994)

Professional ratings
Review scores
Source	Rating
Allmusic	link

Romance & the Stage is an album by Elaine Paige, released in 1993.

It was produced by Peter Matz and recorded at CTS Studios, London. The recording features songs primarily taken from stage musicals of the 1930s and 1940s, such as Annie Get Your Gun and Kismet.

The album was released by RCA Records and distributed in the United Kingdom by BMG.

== Track listing ==
1. "They Say It's Wonderful/I Got Lost in His Arms" – 4.55 (Irving Berlin)
2. "As Time Goes By" – 4.47 (Herman Hupfeld)
3. "Feeling Good" – 4.52 (Leslie Bricusse/Anthony Newley)
4. "More Than You Know" – 3.41 (William Rose/Edward Eliscu/Vincent Youmans)
5. "With Every Breath I Take" – 3.36 (Cy Coleman/David Zippel)
6. "Mad About the Boy" – 5.54 (Noël Coward)
7. "I Gaze in Your Eyes" – 3.40 (Cole Porter/Ann Hampton Callaway)
8. "Kismet Suite: Stranger in Paradise/He's in Love/And This Is My Beloved" – 5.18 (Robert Wright/George Forrest)
9. "Long Before I Knew You" – 3.55 (Jule Styne/Betty Comden/Adolph Green)
10. "How Long Has This Been Going On?" – 3.42 (George Gershwin/Ira Gershwin)
11. "Smoke Gets in Your Eyes" – 3.41 (Jerome Kern/Otto Harbach)
12. "September Song" – 3.48 (Maxwell Anderson/Kurt Weill)
13. "Song of a Summer Night" – 2.29 (Frank Loesser)

== Credits ==
=== Personnel ===
- Elaine Paige – vocals
- Mike Moran – piano
- Harold Fisher – drums
- Paul Keogh – guitar
- Chris Laurence – bass
- Paul Morgan – bass
- Frank Ricotti – percussion
- Don Lusher – trombone
- Jim Hughes – harmonica
- Dave Bishop – tenor saxophone
- Andy Mackintosh – soprano saxophone
- Jack Emblow – musette
- New World Philharmonic Orchestra

=== Production ===
- Producer, orchestrator and conductor – Peter Matz
- Executive Producers – Deke Arlon and Elaine Paige
- Orchestra Manager – David Katz
- Music preparation – Jeremy Thale
- Musical associate to the producer – Kevin Townend
- Recorded at CTS Studios
- Engineer – Steve Price
- Assistant Engineer – Andy Taylor
- Mixer – Mike Moran
- Mix engineer – Tony Taverner
- Assistant mix engineer – James Brown
- Mastered at the Townhouse
- Mastering engineer – Ian Cooper

== Charts ==
Chart (1993)	Peak position
UK Albums (OCC)	71
