= Stages (Elaine Paige album) =

Studio album by Elaine Paige
- Released: 28 October 1983
- Studios: Good Earth (London); Olympic (London)
- Genre: Pop
- Labels: WEA; K-tel
- Producer: Tony Visconti

Elaine Paige chronology
Elaine Paige (1981)	Stages (1983)	Cinema (1984)

Stages is the third studio album by Elaine Paige, released in 1983 on the Warner Music and K-tel labels and has been re-issued on CD. It reached No. 2 on the UK Albums Chart.

== Background ==
Stages features songs from musicals, including tracks from shows in which Paige had appeared. It was the first of a number of her recordings to be produced by Tony Visconti, who had previously worked with David Bowie, The Moody Blues and Mary Hopkin, and was primarily recorded at Visconti's Good Earth Studios, other than for the track "Tomorrow" which was taped at Olympic Studios. The track "Don't Cry for Me Argentina" was taken from the 1978 original London cast recording of Evita.

== Outtakes ==
In 2014, Rhino UK released the compilation album Elaine Paige: The Ultimate Collection which includes the outtake "It's Raining on Prom Night" (from the musical Grease) which was originally recorded as part of the Stages album sessions.

== Other releases ==
Released in Australia by K-tel: NA680.

In 1987, Atlantic Records released the album in the United States. The track listing was amended to open with "On My Own" from Les Misérables, which opened on Broadway that year. "Running Back for More" was omitted from this release.

== Track listing ==
1. "Memory" - 4:09 (Andrew Lloyd Webber, T.S. Eliot, Trevor Nunn) - from the musical Cats
2. "Be On Your Own" - 2:43 (Maury Yeston) - from the musical Nine
3. "Another Suitcase in Another Hall" - 3:23 (Andrew Lloyd Webber, Tim Rice) - from the musical Evita
4. "Send In the Clowns" - 4:09 (Stephen Sondheim, Tom Bahler) - from the musical A Little Night Music
5. "Running Back for More" - 3:14 (Tim Rice, Stephen Oliver) - from the musical Blondel
6. "Good Morning Starshine" - 2:55 (James Rado, Gerome Ragni, Galt MacDermot) - from the musical Hair
7. "Don't Cry for Me Argentina" - 5:38 (Andrew Lloyd Webber, Tim Rice) - from the musical Evita
8. "I Don't Know How to Love Him" - 3:50 (Andrew Lloyd Webber, Tim Rice) - from the musical Jesus Christ Superstar
9. "What I Did for Love" - 3:25 (Marvin Hamlisch, Edward Kleban) - from the musical A Chorus Line
10. "One Night Only" - 3:09 (Tom Eyen, Henry Krieger) - from the musical Dreamgirls
11. "Losing My Mind" - 3:35 (Stephen Sondheim) - from the musical Follies
12. "Tomorrow" - 2:42 (Martin Charnin, Charles Strouse) - from the musical Annie

== Personnel ==
Musicians

- Elaine Paige – lead and backing vocals
- Graham Ward – drums
- Phil Cranham – bass guitar
- Mitch Dalton – guitar
- Robin Smith – keyboards, synthesizers, Fender Rhodes
- Hugh Burns – guitars
- Derek Bramble – bass guitar
- Andy Duncan – drums, percussion
- Mark Williamson – backing vocals
- Tony Visconti – backing vocals
- Annie McGaig – backing vocals
- Maureen Turner – backing vocals
- Mary Hopkin – backing vocals
- John Du Prez – flugelhorn
- David Bitelli – saxophone
- John Thirkell – trumpet, flugelhorn
- Paul Spong – trumpet, flugelhorn
- Spike Edney – trombone

Production

- Producer – Tony Visconti
- Engineers – Chris Porter, Bryan Evans and Keith Grant
- Rhythm track arrangements – Robin Smith
- Orchestral arrangements – Tony Visconti

== Charts ==
Chart (1983)	Peak position
Australia (Kent Music Report)	20
United Kingdom (Official Charts)	2

== Certifications ==
Region	Certification	Certified units/sales
United Kingdom (BPI)	2× Platinum	600,000^{^}
^{^} Shipments figures based on certification alone.
