= Love Can Do That =

Studio album by Elaine Paige
- Released: 15 April 1991
- Recorded: The Zoo, Encino, California
- Genre: Pop
- Label: RCA
- Producer: Dennis Lambert

Elaine Paige chronology
The Collection (1990)	Love Can Do That (1991)	An Evening with Elaine Paige (1991)

Love Can Do That is the eighth studio album by English singer Elaine Paige, released in 1991. It was Paige's first album released by RCA Records and marketed in Europe by BMG. Produced by Dennis Lambert, the album was recorded at The Zoo in Encino, California.

Love Can Do That is the nearest Paige's recordings have come to contemporary pop, featuring a number of ballads that were previously recorded by artists such as Barbra Streisand's "Heart Don't Change My Mind" and Cyndi Lauper's "True Colors". Other songs on the album include "Same Train", a duet with Christopher Cross, and "Only the Very Best", from the concept musical Tycoon, for which Tim Rice wrote the English lyrics. The song was originally performed in French in the musical Starmania.

== Track listing ==
No.	Title	Writer(s)	Length
1.	"Love Can Do That"	Diane Warren	4:24
2.	"Oxygen"	Nik Kershaw	3:59
3.	"Heart Don't Change My Mind"	Warren; Robbie Buchanan	4:31
4.	"Same Train" (featuring Christopher Cross)	Dyna Brein; Cal Curtis; Chris Farren	4:48
5.	"You Don't Own Me"	John Madara; David White	5:11
6.	"I Only Have Eyes for You"	Al Dubin; Harry Warren	4:08
7.	"Well Almost"	Mike Chapman; Holly Knight	4:54
8.	"True Colours"	Tom Kelly; Billy Steinberg	4:16
9.	"If I Love You"	Toni Jolene; Jim Weatherly	4:07
10.	"He's Out of My Life"	Tom Bahler	3:27
11.	"Only the Very Best"	Michel Berger; Luc Plamondon; English lyrics: Tim Rice	4:14
12.	"Grow Young"	Jimmy Webb	3:07

== Personnel ==
=== Musicians ===
- Elaine Paige – vocals
- Christopher Cross – vocals (on "Same Train")
- Claude Gaudette – keyboards, bass, drums and percussion
- Michael Thompson – guitar
- Dennis Lambert – percussion, backing vocals
- Katrina Perkins – backing vocals
- Jean McClain – backing vocals
- Darryl Phinesse – backing vocals
- David Lawrence – keyboards, bass, drums, percussion, backing vocals
- Robbie Buchanan – keyboards, bass, drums, percussion
- Paul Jackson Jr. – guitars
- Michael Baird – drums
- David Boroff – saxophone
- Rickey Grundy Chorale – backing vocals
- Gerald Vince – strings
- Bob Sanov – strings
- Ray Tisher – strings
- Fred Seykora – strings

=== Production ===
- Producer – Dennis Lambert
- Production co-ordinator – Marrianne L. Pellicci
- Assistant engineers – Lawrence Fried, Elaine Anderson, Sally Browder, Pat MacDougal
- Arranger and programmer – Claude Gaudette, Robbie Buchanan, David Lawrence
- Basic track, vocals and guitar recording – Jeremy Smith, Doug Rider, Gabe Veltri
- Mixing – Brian Malouf, Jeremy Smith, Doug Rider, Gabe Veltri
- Strings contractor – Joe Saldo
- Recorded at The Zoo, Encino, California
- Mixed at The Zoo, Smoketree, O'Henry and Can Am Studios, California

== Charts ==
Chart performance for Love Can Do That
Chart (1991)	Peak position
UK Albums (OCC)	36
