= Charles Dumont (singer) =

French singer and composer (1929–2024)

- Charles Dumont, c. 2000
- Born: 26 March 1929; Cahors, France
- Died: 18 November 2024 (aged 95); Paris, France
- Occupations: Singer; songwriter; musician
- Musical career
- Genres: Cabaret; torch songs; modern chanson
- Instruments: Vocals; piano; trumpet
- Labels: EMI; Philips
- Website: charlesdumont.free.fr

Charles Gaston Dumont (26 March 1929 – 18 November 2024) was a French singer and composer. Dumont is best remembered for writing or co-writing more than 30 of the most well-known songs recorded by singer Édith Piaf, including "Non, je ne regrette rien".

== Biography ==
Dumont was born in Cahors, France, on 26 March 1929. He wrote songs until the 1960s, sometimes under an alias, for Dalida, Gloria Lasso, Luis Mariano and Tino Rossi. He worked with lyricist Michel Vaucaire. In 1956 they wrote "Non, je ne regrette rien", recorded in 1960 by Édith Piaf. That led to more than 30 songs for her, such as "Flonflons du Bal", "Mon Dieu" and "Les Amants", which Piaf and Dumont wrote and sang together in 1962.

Dumont tells in the book Édith Piaf, Opinions publiques, by Bernard Marchois (1995), that Michel Vaucaire's original title was "Non, je ne trouverai rien" (No, I will not find anything) and that the song was meant for the French singer Rosalie Dubois. However, thinking of Piaf, he changed the title to "Non, je ne regrette rien" (No, I Regret Nothing).

According to journalist Jean Noli, in his book Édith (1973), when Charles Dumont and Michel Vaucaire visited Piaf's home at Boulevard Lannes in Paris, on 24 October 1960, she received them in a very impolite and unfriendly manner. Dumont had several times tried to offer Piaf his compositions, but she disliked them and had refused them – the standard was too low, according to her. On that day she was furious that her housekeeper Danielle had arranged a meeting with the two men without informing her. So she let them wait an hour in her living room before she appeared. "As you can see I am extremely tired", she said to them, very irritated. "Hurry up, only one song! Quick to the piano, go ahead!" she commanded. Nervous and perspiring, Dumont sang the song in a low voice. When he finished there was a big silence, as they waited for Piaf's verdict. "Will you sing it again?" asked Piaf in a sharp voice. When he was hardly halfway through, she interrupted him. "Formidable! [Fantastic!]" she exclaimed. "Formidable. This is the song I have been waiting for. It will be my biggest success! I want it for my coming performance at L'Olympia!" Vaucaire, delighted, replied, "Of course, Édith, the song is yours".

Piaf dedicated her recording of the song to the French Foreign Legion. At the time of the recording, France was engaged in a military conflict, the Algerian War (1954–1962), and the 1st REP (1st Foreign Parachute Regiment)—which backed the failed 1961 putsch against president Charles de Gaulle and the civilian leadership of Algeria—adopted the song when their resistance was broken.

Piaf's death in 1963 led him to work with Jacques Brel, writing "Je m'en remets à toi" in 1964, and to writing songs for television shows such as Michel Vaillant in 1967, and cinema such as Trafic by Jacques Tati in 1971.

He and Vaucaire wrote a song about the Berlin Wall, which had just gone up, called "Le mur", intended for Piaf. After she died, they heard that Barbra Streisand wanted it for an album of French-based songs. In 1966, Streisand released her eighth album, Je m'appelle Barbra, with "Le mur" on it, sung all in French. Most of the songs on the Je m'appelle Barbra album were arranged and conducted by Michel Legrand, the first time Streisand and Legrand had worked together. Later, an American lyricist, Earl Shuman, wrote an English-language version titled "I've Been Here". This song is not a translation of "Le mur" but a completely different song that just uses Dumont's Bolero-style music. "I've Been Here" was recorded separately by Streisand and was on the "B" side of a 45 rpm., with "Free Again" on the "A" side.

In the 1970s, Dumont started a career as interpreter with songs such as "Une chanson"' (1976) and "Les amours impossibles" (1978).

Dumont died in his sleep, following a long illness, during the night of 18 November 2024. He was 95.
