= Non, je ne regrette rien =

1960 song performed by Édith Piaf

Song by Édith Piaf
- Language: French
- Released: 1960
- Label: 2m 32s
- Composer: Charles Dumont
- Lyricist: Michel Vaucaire

"Non, je ne regrette rien" (pronounced [nɔ̃ ʒə nə ʁəɡʁɛt ʁjɛ̃]; transl. "No, I regret nothing") is a French song composed in 1956 by Charles Dumont, with lyrics by Michel Vaucaire. Édith Piaf's 1960 recording spent seven weeks atop the French Singles & Airplay Reviews chart.

== Background ==
The song's composer, Charles Dumont, states in the book Édith Piaf, Opinions publiques, by Bernard Marchois (TF1 Editions 1995), that Michel Vaucaire's original title was "Non, je ne trouverai rien" ('No, I Will Not Find Anything') and that the song was meant for the French singer Rosalie Dubois. However, thinking of Piaf, he changed the title to "Non, je ne regrette rien" ('No, I Regret Nothing').

According to journalist Jean Noli, in his book Édith (Éditions Stock 1973), when Dumont and Vaucaire visited Piaf's home at Boulevard Lannes in Paris, on 24 October 1960, she received them in a very impolite and unfriendly manner. Dumont had tried to offer Piaf his compositions on several occasions, but she disliked them and refused them. On that day, she was furious that her housekeeper Danielle had arranged a meeting with the two men without informing her, so she let them wait an hour in her living room before she appeared. She told them she would listen to one song only. Dumont sang "Non, je ne regrette rien", to which Piaf reacted extremely positively, saying "This is the song I have been waiting for. It will be my biggest success! I want it for my coming performance at l'Olympia!"

Piaf dedicated her recording of the song to the French Foreign Legion. At the time of the recording, France was engaged in a military conflict, the Algerian War (1954–1962), and the 1st Foreign Parachute Regiment—which backed the failed 1961 putsch against President Charles de Gaulle and the civilian leadership of Algeria—adopted the song when their resistance was broken. The leadership of the Regiment was arrested and tried but the non-commissioned officers, corporals and Legionnaires were assigned to other Foreign Legion formations. They left the barracks singing the song, which has now become part of the Foreign Legion heritage and is sung when they are on parade.

== Song ==
The song begins, Non, rien de rien / Non, je ne regrette rien ("No, nothing at all / No, I regret nothing"). It goes on to describe how the singer has swept away all of her past and cares nothing for it, ending Car ma vie, car mes joies / Aujourd'hui, ça commence avec toi ("For my life, for my joys / Today, it starts with you").

== Other recordings ==
The song has been recorded by other performers, including:

- Piaf herself recorded an English version, titled "No Regrets".
- Aliza Kashi on her 1963 album A Internacional Aliza Kashi.
- Shirley Bassey in 1965, (reaching No. 39 on the UK charts).
- Kathy Kirby recorded the English translation in 1965.
- Karen Akers on her 1981 album Presenting Karen Akers.
- German singer Martinique released a Disco/Synth-Pop version "No Regrets (Non, Je Ne Regrette Rien)" in 1984
- Bad Boys Blue in 1989, on album The Fifth recorded an English version titled "No Regrets".
- The rock band Half Man Half Biscuit recorded a 1991 English version titled "No Regrets".
- La Toya Jackson in her 1992 Moulin Rouge revue Formidable.
- Emmylou Harris contributed an English version to the 1994 multi-artist Tribute to Edith Piaf album.
- Elaine Paige on 1994 album Piaf, released to coincide with her portrayal of the lead character in the play of the same name.
- Brazilian singer Cássia Eller on her 2001 Acústico MTV album.
- Vicky Leandros on her 2010 album Zeitlos (Timeless) sung in German with the title "Nein, ich bereue nichts" .
- Cajun band Steve Riley and the Mamou Playboys on their 2011 album Grand Isle.
- Actress Frances McDormand as Captain Chantel DuBois sang the song in Madagascar 3: Europe's Most Wanted.
- Raquel Bitton sang "No Regrets" in the film Piaf..Her story..Her songs and in the CD Raquel Bitton sings Edith Piaf.

=== Other languages ===
- "Nej, jag ångrar ingenting" (Swedish) by Anita Lindblom in 1961
- "Ne oplakujem" (Croatian) by Tereza Kesovija in 1962
- "Ne oplakujem" (Croatian) by Ana Štefok in 1964
- "Ne, ne žalim ni za čim" (Serbian) by Lola Novaković in 1964
- "Nej, jag ångrar ingenting" (Swedish) by Gun Sjöberg in 1966
- "Nelituj" (Czech) by Světlana Nálepková in 2005
- "Ne, ni mi žal" (Slovenian) by Aleš Polajnar in 2014
- "No dico no" (Italian) by Dalida
- "No me puedo quejar" (Spanish) by Dalida
- "Nah de Nah" (Spanish) by Javiera Mena
- "Nem, nem bánok semmit sem" (Hungarian) by Vári Éva
- Elvina Makarian (Armenian Jazz Singer).
- "No em penedeixo de res" (Catalan) by Marina Rossell

== In popular culture ==
- In the United Kingdom, the song was at one time associated with the former Conservative politician Norman Lamont, former Chancellor of the Exchequer, who quoted the song's title to sum up his political career.
- The song was adopted as "a personal anthem" by the former Dutch colonial soldier Johan Cornelis Princen (better known as Poncke Princen).
- The song is used in many movies, including Bull Durham (1988); Doris Dörrie's film Nobody Loves Me (1994); La Haine (1995), where the song is mixed with "Sound of da Police" by KRS-1; Babe: Pig in the City (1998); Bernardo Bertolucci's film The Dreamers (2003), the Coen Brothers' film Intolerable Cruelty, the 2005 film Monamour, the 2006 film Piaf Her story Her songs, the French criminal biopic Mesrine (2008), Valiant (2005), a British animated film about World War II; Inception (2010), where the song is connected with hypnic jerk; and Madagascar 3: Europe's Most Wanted (2012). Piaf's English version is used in Luc Besson's Dogman (2023).
- The song features prominently in the biographic movie La Vie en Rose, which tells the story of Édith Piaf (portrayed by French actress Marion Cotillard)
- A Spanish version of the song performed by Javiera Mena, plays during the end credits of the 2012 Chilean film Young and Wild.
- The song has been featured in many episodes of television and streaming programs, including season 11 episode 14 of Supernatural, season 4 episode 12 of The Good Wife, season 23 episode 13 of the Simpsons, season 3 episode 10 of Druck, season 2 episode 6 of Why Women Kill, season 3 episode 6 of In the Dark, the conclusion of episode 10 of the first season of the series Ted Lasso, the SBS Korean Drama The Penthouse, season 2 episode 9 of the series Preacher, season 1 episode 1 of Wednesday, in several episodes during season 2 of Star Trek: Picard, season 1 episode 4 of The Gentlemen and episode 1 of the miniseries Knuckles.
- This song was added to The Boring Company website when 50,000 "boring hats" were sold.
- Lyrics from this song are featured in Rammstein's "Frühling in Paris" from Liebe ist für alle da (2009).
- Édith Piaf's recording has been used in numerous television commercials in the United Kingdom, notably for Specsavers and Zoflora.
- Japanese figure skater Kaori Sakamoto performed to the song as a part of a Édith Piaf medley free skate during the 2025–26 season, Sakamoto's final season before retirement.

== Charts ==
Chart performance for "Non, je ne regrette rien" by Édith Piaf
Chart (1960–2023)	Peak position
Austria (Billboard)	6
Belgium (Ultratop 50 Flanders)	6
Belgium (Juke Box Flanders)	1
Belgium (Ultratop 50 Wallonia)	1
France (IFOP)	1
Hungary (Single Top 40)	37
Italy (AFI)	8
Netherlands (Single Top 100)	1
Spain (Discomania)	20
Switzerland (Schweizer Hitparade)	5

== Certifications and sales ==
Certifications and sales for "Non, je ne regrette rien"
Region	Certification	Certified units/sales
France	—	800,000
Netherlands	—	125,000
United Kingdom (BPI)	Silver	200,000^{‡}
^{‡} Sales+streaming figures based on certification alone.
