= Elaine Paige =

English singer and actress (born 1948)

Dame Elaine Paige DBE
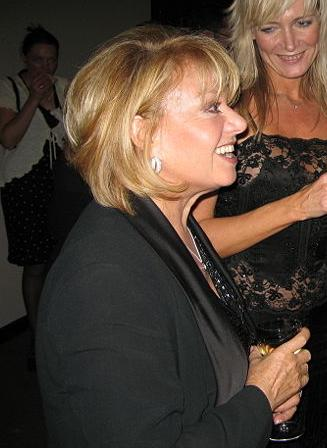
- Paige in 2006

Background information
- Born: Elaine Jill Bickerstaff; 5 March 1948 (age 78); Barnet, Hertfordshire, England
- Occupations: Singer, actress
- Years active: 1964–present
- Website: elainepaige.com

Dame Elaine Paige (born Elaine Jill Bickerstaff, 5 March 1948) is an English singer and actress, best known for her work in musical theatre. Raised in Barnet, London, Paige attended the Aida Foster Theatre School, making her first professional appearance on stage in 1964, at the age of 16. Her appearance in the 1968 production of Hair marked her West End debut.

Following a number of roles over the next decade, Paige was selected to play Eva Perón in the first production of Andrew Lloyd Webber's Evita in 1978, which brought her to the attention of the broader public. For this role, she won the Laurence Olivier Award for Performance of the Year in a musical. She originated the role of Grizabella in Cats and had a Top 10 hit with "Memory", a song from the show. In 1985, Paige released "I Know Him So Well" with Barbara Dickson from the musical Chess, which remains the biggest-selling record by a female duo. She then appeared in the original stage production of Chess, followed by a starring role in Anything Goes which she also co-produced. Paige made her Broadway debut in Sunset Boulevard in 1996, playing the lead role of Norma Desmond, to critical acclaim. She appeared in The King and I from 2000 to 2001, and six years later she returned to the West End stage in The Drowsy Chaperone. She has also worked sporadically in television.

In addition to being nominated for five Laurence Olivier Awards, Paige has won many other awards for her theatre roles and has been called the First Lady of British Musical Theatre due to her skill and longevity. She has released 22 solo albums, of which eight were consecutively certified gold and another four multi-platinum. Paige is also featured on seven cast albums and has sung in concerts across the world. Since 2004 she has hosted her own show on BBC Radio 2 called Elaine Paige on Sunday.

In 2014, Paige celebrated her 50 years in show business. Paige announced on her official website a "Farewell" concert tour and a new career-spanning album The Ultimate Collection to mark this milestone in her career. Outside of her work in musical theatre, Paige is a vice-president of The Children's Trust, a UK charity for children with brain injury.

== Early life and education ==
Elaine Jill Bickerstaff was born and raised in Barnet, Hertfordshire, where her father Eric worked as an estate agent and her mother Irene was a milliner. Her mother had been a singer in her youth, and her father was an amateur drummer. Paige stands at just under 5 feet (1.5 m) tall, which she says has caused her to lose out on leading roles. Her original ambition was to become a professional tennis player, at which point her headmistress pointed out to her "they'd never see you over the net", but Paige continued to play tennis and has referred to the sport as one of her passions.

At 14, Paige listened to the film soundtrack of West Side Story, which evoked the desire for a career in musical theatre. Paige's musical ability was encouraged by her school music teacher, Ann Hill, who was also the head of the music department. Paige was a member of Hill's choir, and her first role on stage was playing Susanna in a school production of Mozart's The Marriage of Figaro, which was followed by parts in The Boy Mozart and solos in Handel's Messiah – "a difficult work for little children".

She attended Southaw Girls' School – a secondary modern in Oakleigh Park in Hertfordshire where she received two CSE qualifications.

Her father suggested that she should go to drama school, so she attended the Aida Foster Theatre School. Lacking confidence, she initially disliked stage school; her father encouraged her to persevere and she grew to enjoy her time there.

After graduating, her first job was modelling children's clothing at the Ideal Home Exhibition.

== Career ==
=== 1968–1980: West End debut, new name and Evita ===
Paige's first professional appearance happened when she was 16 years old, fresh from drama school. She was rejected in her first audition, singing "I Cain't Say No". Her drama school teacher encouraged her to change her name and audition again under the new name. Browsing through a phone book for inspiration, she became aware of the "page" she was observing and decided upon that name with the addition of an "i", becoming Elaine Paige. She was successful in the second audition as Elaine Paige, appearing on stage during the UK tour of the Anthony Newley/Leslie Bricusse musical The Roar of the Greasepaint – The Smell of the Crowd in 1964, playing the role of a Chinese urchin. In 1968 she appeared on record as a member of the vocal group Colors of Love, who released three Albert Hammond & Mike Hazlewood-penned singles, most notably "I'm a Train", on Larry Page's Page One label under the supervision of Alan Moorhouse. She was also part of the band Sparrow with fellow West End singer Diane Langton, releasing the album Hatching Out in 1972.

At the age of 20, she made her West End debut in Hair on 27 September 1968, remaining in the cast until March 1970. While also being an understudy for the character of Sheila, she played a member of the tribe in the chorus, for which role she was required to be naked on stage in one scene. In 1971, she appeared in the ill-fated musical about premature ejaculation, Maybe That's Your Problem. She also appeared as an urchin in the film Oliver! Over the next decade, she played roles in various musicals, including Jesus Christ Superstar; Nuts; Grease, in which she played the lead role of Sandy from 1973 to 1974; Billy, from 1974 to 1975 playing Rita; and The Boyfriend, as Maisie (1975–1976). She had a minor role as a barmaid in the 1978 sex comedy film Adventures of a Plumber's Mate.

After months of acting and singing auditions, Hal Prince offered the still relatively unknown Paige the title role of Eva Perón in the first stage production of the Tim Rice and Andrew Lloyd Webber musical, Evita. Her performance won her critical acclaim and brought her into public prominence at the age of 30. Julie Covington, who played the role on the original concept album, had turned down the opportunity of playing the role on stage leading to a long search for a new star. Paige eventually competed against Bonnie Schoen, an American initially favoured by Prince for the role. She later said, "Bonnie was already a big name on Broadway. In a way, she didn't have anything to prove. She was smoothly, silkily professional. But I saw this as my big chance and, like Eva when she clapped eyes on Peron, I grabbed with both hands. I wanted the role more than anything else in the whole world." For her performance in Evita, she won the Laurence Olivier Award for Best Performance in a Musical, which at that time was called the Society of West End Theatre Award. She also won the Variety Club Award for Showbusiness Personality of the Year. She played the role for 20 months in total, from 1978 to 1980. She also released her first studio album in 1978, titled Sitting Pretty.

Just prior to her success in Evita, Paige had strongly considered becoming a nursery nurse, but after she sang for Dustin Hoffman, he made her promise that she would continue in theatre work. She admitted that she was "fed up with the whole thing" and that she could not even afford new clothing or to eat out; "Evita saved me" she stated. In the 1980 ITV drama series Lady Killers, Paige played convicted murderer Kate Webster.

=== 1981–1993: Cats and Chess era ===
In 1981, in the Tales of the Unexpected episode "The Way to Do it", Paige plays Susie, a girl working in a small casino trying to keep guests happy and finally eloping with the main character.

Paige went on to portray some of Lloyd Webber's most notable female characters, creating the role of Grizabella in the original production of Cats from 11 May 1981 to 13 February 1982. She took on the role late in the rehearsal process when the actress Judi Dench had to withdraw due to a torn Achilles tendon. Paige's performance of the song "Memory" from Cats, with which she had a Top 10 hit, is her signature piece. The single reached number 6 in the UK charts and has since been recorded by a further 160 artists. She reprised the role of Grizabella for the video release of Cats in 1998, one of only two performers in the film from the original London cast; the other was Susan Jane Tanner as Jellylorum. Paige's website claims that the video soon became the bestselling music video in the UK and America.

The 1983 production of Abbacadabra, written by former ABBA members, Björn Ulvaeus and Benny Andersson, saw Paige star in the role of Carabosse. She then originated the role of Florence for the 1984 concept album of Chess, with lyrics by Tim Rice and music by Ulvaeus and Andersson. Her albums, Stages (1983), and Cinema (1984), rejoined the cast recording of Chess in the UK top 40 chart, giving her three consecutive successful albums. In 1985, Paige released "I Know Him So Well", a duet from Chess, singing with Barbara Dickson. The single held the number 1 position in the British singles charts for four weeks, and still remains the biggest-selling record by a female duo, according to the Guinness Book of Records. From 1986 to 1987, Paige appeared as Florence in the stage production of Chess, a role that earned her a second Olivier Award nomination, this time in the category, Best Actress in a Musical. She next sang at the White House in 1988.

Paige then took on the part of Reno Sweeney in the musical production of Anything Goes, which she co-produced and starred in from 1989 to 1990. Patti LuPone was appearing in Anything Goes on Broadway around that time, so Paige sought to become the co-producer of the West End production as a way to secure the role there before LuPone could take it. Playing Reno Sweeney was Paige's first experience using an American accent on stage, and the role earned her a third Olivier Award nomination. Beyond her theatre roles, she appeared in the television programme Unexplained Laughter in 1989 alongside Diana Rigg.

In 1993, Paige signed up for a year as French chanteuse Édith Piaf in Pam Gems' musical play, Piaf, to critical acclaim. The Guardian wrote that Paige was "a magnificent, perfect Piaf". The demanding production required her to sing 15 songs, some in French, and to be on stage for 2 hours 40 minutes in total, and forced her to leave early due to exhaustion. Her portrayal of Piaf earned her an Olivier Award nomination for Best Actress in a Musical, her fourth nomination. She subsequently released an album, titled Piaf, containing Édith Piaf songs.

=== 1994–2001: Sunset Boulevard and Broadway debut ===
In 1995, Paige was appointed an Officer of the Order of the British Empire (OBE) by Queen Elizabeth II for her contributions to musical theatre.

Paige stepped briefly into the role of Norma Desmond in Lloyd Webber's West End production of Sunset Boulevard in 1994, when Betty Buckley was taken ill and had to undergo an emergency appendectomy. The nature of the situation meant that Paige only had two and a half weeks in the rehearsal process before her first performance. She admitted feeling daunted by the prospect, having seen Glenn Close in the role on Broadway just prior to entering rehearsals. London critics were largely won over by Paige in a performance that "not only wrings out every ounce of dramatic action but delivers some unexpected humour as well" and she took over the part full-time the following year. She then won the Variety Club Award for Best Actress of the Year, and received her fifth Olivier Award nomination in 1996.

During the run of Sunset Boulevard at the West End's Adelphi Theatre in 1995, Paige discovered a lump in her breast, prompting her to consult her doctor, who at first reassured her there was nothing to be concerned about. She returned twice, and her doctor subsequently sent her for tests that confirmed the lump was cancerous, nine months after she discovered it. Continuing her role in the production Paige did not miss a show. Paige went in for day surgery on a Sunday due to her theatre commitments, had five years of medical treatment and completed a radiation programme. She has since described the period as "the most awful thing that's happened to me in my life".

Paige transferred to the New York production of Sunset Boulevard to make her Broadway debut at the Minskoff Theatre on 12 September 1996, staying with the show until it closed on 22 March 1997. On the Sunset Boulevard set in Broadway, the staircase steps had to be raised six inches (15 cm) in order to accommodate Paige's short stature, or it would have been hard to see her behind the banister. Paige was welcomed to the Broadway stage with a long standing ovation from the audience, and received largely positive reviews for her New York performance as Norma Desmond: "The lush sound and the sheer power of her voice are, to put it simply, incredible", wrote one critic, whilst another said "Her voice has great range, remarkable clarity and emotional force". Paige was the first Norma Desmond in Sunset Boulevard to sing one of the show's key songs, "With One Look", which she did first at Lloyd Webber's wedding to Madeleine Gurdon, although at the time the song was called "Just One Glance". Lloyd Webber noted, regarding Paige's performance of one of the show's other prominent songs, "As If We Never Said Goodbye", that it was "as good, if not the best, of anything I've ever heard of mine". Regarding the key lyric in the song, "This world's waited long enough. I've come home at last", Paige had sought to change the way the melody was sung, despite being fully aware of Lloyd-Webber's fastidious tendencies. To her, the moment was not exploited to its fullest potential, so she approached the show's musical director, David Caddick, and expressed her wish to hold the word "home", to which he agreed. Although she had been disappointed when she hoped to perform on Broadway in Evita, Cats and Chess, Paige stated of her debut there, "It was just the most perfect time to go with that particular show". After Sunset Boulevard finished, she developed depression, commenting that the show's closing "was the most terrible feeling. ... I'd felt I'd lost something so very important to me. I thought it had died and gone away."

Arts commentator Melvyn Bragg hosted a special edition of The South Bank Show about Paige's career in 1996, titled The Faces of Elaine Paige. The episode saw her visiting parts of the world where plays she had starred in had been set: the Casa Rosada in Buenos Aires, Argentina where Eva Perón had given speeches; the Parisian haunts of Edith Piaf including a meeting with her collaborator Charles Aznavour; and Sunset Boulevard, Los Angeles.

In 1997, Paige made her United States concert debut when she opened the Boston Pops season, which was aired on WGBH in America. The following year, she made a guest appearance at Andrew Lloyd Webber's 50th birthday celebration at the Royal Albert Hall, performing "Don't Cry for Me Argentina" and "Memory" She then played Célimène in the non-musical play The Misanthrope in 1998, but she admitted that she missed the musical element and that the silence was slightly unsettling to her. A Lifetime Achievement Award from The National Operatic and Dramatic Association soon followed. She later performed alongside Bette Midler in a 1999 New York concert to raise money for the Breast Cancer Research Foundation.

From 2000 to 2001, she starred as Anna Leonowens in a revival of Rodgers and Hammerstein's The King and I at the London Palladium. Paige had turned down an offer for the role the first time she was approached, but later accepted, admitting that she had "forgotten what a fantastic score it was", although she did question her own suitability for the role. Before the opening, the box office had already taken in excess of £7 million in ticket sales. The critic for The Independent commented, "It may well be impossible to be a success as Evita and a success as Anna" complaining that Paige was not refined enough for the role, whereas The Spectator asserted that the role further strengthened her title as the "First Lady of British Musical Theatre". During her time in The King and I, her mother was diagnosed with cancer. Despite Paige wanting to pull out of the show, her mother insisted that she should continue until her contract had finished, and Paige's sister, Marion Billings, admitted, "That was very hard for Elaine, having to go on stage night after night knowing she wanted to be with Mum".

=== 2002–2013: Radio and return to West End and Broadway ===
Paige sang at the opening of the 2002 Winter Olympics in Salt Lake City, and then made her Los Angeles concert debut at the Pasadena Civic Auditorium. In 2003, she played Angèle in Where There's a Will, directed by Peter Hall. She next sang the role of Mrs Lovett in the New York City Opera production of Stephen Sondheim's Sweeney Todd in March 2004, earning positive reviews from critics, and a nomination for a Drama Desk Award for Outstanding Actress in a Musical. Paige then embarked upon a UK tour which was titled "No Strings Attached".

In September 2004, Paige began a weekly Sunday afternoon radio show, Elaine Paige on Sunday, between 1 and 3 pm on BBC Radio 2, featuring music from musical theatre and film. The 400th edition was broadcast on Sunday 29 July 2012. In an unfavourable review, the show was described by Elisabeth Mahoney of The Guardian as "a chilly, alienating listening experience" and a "rare wrong move" on the part of Radio 2. Lisa Martland of The Stage agreed that "it is by far the music that brings me back to the programme ... and not her lightweight presenting style". However, the show regularly attracts 3 million listeners, and interviews are also featured each week. Paige also focused on television appearances, playing Dora Bunner in the 2005 ITV adaptation of Agatha Christie's A Murder Is Announced in the Marple series, before performing a guest role as a post mistress in Where the Heart Is. The episode of Marple was watched by 7.78 million viewers.

The release of Paige's first full studio album of new recordings in 12 years was marked in 2006, titled Essential Musicals. The album included popular songs from musicals identified by a poll on her radio show, in which 400,000 listeners voted. At this point, Paige had recorded 20 solo albums in total, of which eight were consecutively certified gold and another four multi-platinum, and she had been featured on seven cast albums. Paige also appeared in concert in Scandinavia, Hong Kong, Europe, the Middle East, New Zealand, Australia and Singapore. On 20 and 21 December 2006, she performed in concert in Shanghai, extending her concert tour to two dates to satisfy demand. With a noticeable absence from musical theatre, having not taken a role for many years, she explained in 2006 that "there's been nothing that I've wanted to do, and if you're going to commit to a year at the theatre, six days a week, and have no life, then it's got to be something that you want to do with all your heart". She also affirmed that she believes for older actors it becomes harder to obtain theatre roles.

In 2007, Paige made a return to the West End stage for the first time in six years, as the Chaperone/Beatrice Stockwell in The Drowsy Chaperone at the Novello Theatre. The production ran for a disappointing 96 performances, although it had opened to a standing ovation from the audience and a generally optimistic reaction from critics. The Daily Telegraph wrote, "Elaine Paige is a good sport ... enduring jokes about her reputation for being 'difficult' with a grin that doesn't seem all that forced. ... Only the self-importantly serious and the chronically depressed will fail to enjoy this preposterously entertaining evening". Paul Taylor from The Independent was less impressed and wrote "a miscast Elaine Paige manages to be unfunny to an almost ingenious degree as the heroine's bibulous minder". For her performance, Paige was nominated for a What's On Stage Award in the category of Best Supporting Actress in a Musical. She next collaborated with the duo Secret Garden in recording the song "The Things You Are to Me" for their 2007 album, Inside I'm Singing.

To raise money for Sport Relief, Paige danced the tango on Sport Relief does Strictly Come Dancing with Matt Dawson in March 2008, where they were voted second overall. In 2008, she opened the Llangollen International Musical Eisteddfod and performed concerts in China, America and Australia featuring songs from her 40-year career. To further celebrate 40 years since her first performance on a West End Stage, in October 2008 Paige released a picture-based autobiography titled Memories. The book took around eight months to compile; "Since Evita I suppose, I had kept a yearbook. My parents always kept cuttings and things like that for me. I did have quite a lot of reference material to work out," Paige commented.

An album titled Elaine Paige and Friends was produced by Phil Ramone in 2010. The album features duets with Paige and artists such as Johnny Mathis, Barry Manilow and Olivia Newton-John as well as a duet with Sinéad O'Connor of a new song "It's Only Life" penned by Tim Rice and Gary Barlow. Having entered the top 20 of UK Album Charts, it went on to achieve gold status.

Paige played the role of Carlotta Campion in the Kennedy Center production of Follies in May and June 2011 at the Eisenhower Theatre in Washington, DC, receiving favourable reviews for her performance of the showstopper, "I'm Still Here." The principal cast also comprised Bernadette Peters, Jan Maxwell, Ron Raines and Danny Burstein. She reprised this role in the Broadway transfer of the musical at the Marquis Theatre from August 2011 until the following January, before performing at the Ahmanson Theatre, Los Angeles, California in May and June 2012.

=== 2014–present: 50th Anniversary, farewell tour ===
At the end of 2013 Paige announced a concert tour, Page by Page by Paige, which focused on her 50th anniversary in show business and was advertised as a farewell tour. The 40th-anniversary tour in 2008 marked 40 years since her debut on the West End stage, and the 50th-anniversary tour in 2014 marked 50 years since her first stage performance. The tour featured Garðar Thór Cortes performing a number of songs, both solo and duets with Paige, and was sold out at all venues. The tour ran from 9 to 20 October 2014, concluding at the Royal Albert Hall, London. Other stops included Cardiff, Bristol, Manchester, Newcastle (Gateshead), Glasgow, Birmingham and Bournemouth. Due to a throat infection, one concert in Brighton had to be cancelled. Dates in Ireland were postponed before being rescheduled, with Paige giving four sold-out concerts in Dublin (two evenings), Limerick and Cork between 10 and 16 February 2015.

In 2014, Paige presented and performed in a six episode television show for Sky Arts television called The Elaine Paige Show. The show featured songs performed by Paige, masterclasses with drama college students and interviews and performances by West End and Broadway performers and writers. The show was recorded in March and April at Riverside Studios, London. She released a new career-spanning album The Ultimate Collection in May 2014. In June, Paige made her debut at G-A-Y's Heaven nightclub in London and in November, she joined the inaugural Australian cruise of the performing arts on the MS Radiance of the Seas.

In May 2015 Paige was part of VE Day 70: A Party to Remember, a special concert which took place at the Horse Guards Parade, and was broadcast live on BBC1 and BBC Radio 2. Later in 2015 she performed in concert at Scarborough Open Air Theatre, supported by Collabro and Rhydian, and then headlined the Glamis Prom 2015 at Glamis Castle, Scotland, with Susan Boyle as her guest. The Royal Philharmonic Orchestra accompanied at both concerts.

In April 2016, it was announced that Paige would perform a number of concerts – on successive weekends rather than intensive schedule of a regular tour – entitled "Stripped Back". The tour initially ran from October until December 2016 and featured music by Harry Nilsson, Randy Newman, Jimmy Webb, Burt Bacharach, Leonard Cohen, Sting, Elton John and Lennon-McCartney.

Paige appeared in a new BBC adaptation of William Shakespeare's A Midsummer Night's Dream adapted by Russell T Davies as part of the Shakespeare 400 celebrations in 2016.

In 2017, she appeared in pantomime at the London Palladium as Queen Rat in Dick Whittington alongside Julian Clary, Nigel Havers, Paul Zerdin, Gary Wilmot, Charlie Stemp, Emma Williams, Ashley Banjo and Diversity. She returned for Pantoland at The Palladium in 2020, along with most of the 2017 cast as well as Beverley Knight.

In 2018, Paige played the part of Mercy Hackett in the BBC TV comedy Home from Home. In 2020, she appeared in the BBC drama series Life with Alison Steadman and Peter Davison.

Paige was appointed Dame Commander of the Order of the British Empire (DBE) in the 2025 Birthday Honours for services to music and to charity.

== Personal life ==
Paige has never married or had children, although she had an 11-year relationship with the lyricist Tim Rice throughout the 1980s. She has said that she originally wanted to have children, but "it's a wonderful life I have, so I'm very fulfilled in other ways."

Paige visited her gynecologist with a painful lump in her breast on two occasions but was "fobbed off"; on her third visit in 1995, she insisted that she be referred to a specialist consultant who confirmed her breast cancer diagnosis and she underwent immediate surgery radiotherapy and seven years of medication.

== Legacy ==
Having had so many starring roles in famous musicals, many to critical acclaim, Paige is often referred to as the First Lady of British Musical Theatre. In 2008, she celebrated the 40th anniversary of her professional debut on the West End stage.

Paige's singing and acting abilities have won her worldwide praise, with Andrew Gans of Playbill magazine writing that "Paige's gift is to dissect a role and determine what phrasing, gesture or emotion can bring a scene to its fullest dramatic potential". Mark Shenton also highlighted her voice in 2008 as "one of the most distinctive and impressive voices in the business". Lloyd-Webber insists that her rendition of "As If We Never Said Goodbye" is one of the best interpretations of a song by him.

Paige has been called "difficult". The Times' Brian Logan wrote, "Paige is not exactly known for her humility. In newspaper profiles, that dread word 'difficult' is often applied". On one occasion, she told a male interviewer that she was going to stop giving interviews to female reporters because, in her own words, "I don't trust other women in these situations. They establish a sisterhood with you and then betray it every time". What has been seen as a cold side to her personality was also noted by Logan, but Paige has said that a common misconception of her is that she is confident and very serious. Another editor found her "refreshingly down-to-earth" and "very friendly".

Susan Boyle cited Paige as her inspiration in her audition on Britain’s Got Talent.

== Views on theatre ==
Though Paige has enjoyed a long career in musical theatre, she rarely goes to watch musicals, much preferring to watch films or plays. She considers herself primarily an actress, rather than a singer, stating, "I really prefer to be in character". Comparing the work of Rodgers and Hammerstein to that of Lloyd Webber, Paige has said that she finds Rodgers and Hammerstein songs more difficult to sing, and described them as challenging. She concluded, "it's a quieter kind of singing, more controlled, not belting it out".

In the light of the physical demands of performing in theatre Paige has said "Musical theatre is the hardest thing any actor will ever do. You become obsessive about sleeping, eating the right food, not speaking and giving yourself vocal rest and keeping exercised". Regarding the pressure of having to be in a fit condition to perform in theatre each night, she remarked "you wouldn't want to read the letters people write when you're off and they're disappointed – it's so awful, the guilt one feels for not being there". As part of a rigorous routine before musical roles to look after her voice, Paige stops eating dairy products and drinking alcohol and works hard on her fitness. After about three months into the production when her voice is tiring from performing, she withdraws from her normal social life, sometimes only communicating by notepad and fax. She never reads her reviews, finding that it is not helpful to hear too many opinions of her work.

In 2007, Paige named reality television series such as Any Dream Will Do, which aimed to find an unknown actor to play the lead role in a musical, as the greatest threat to theatre today, believing that "actors already striving in the theatre wouldn't dream of putting themselves on these shows". In a later interview, she questioned the seriousness of the actors auditioning for this type of show: "you wouldn't put yourself up for one of those shows in case you got bumped off the first week and all your colleagues saw it". She has also expressed a wish for more new musicals to be put into production, instead of frequent revivals.

== Charity ==
Paige has been an Ambassador of The Children's Trust, the UK's leading charity for children with brain injury and neurodisability, for over 35 years, since the charity was created, when she first presented the charity with a minibus. She has hosted and performed at fundraising events for the charity including hosting 5 bi-annual Elaine Paige Clay Pigeon Shoots.

== Theatre credits ==
Duration	Production	Role	Theatre	Awards
1968–1970	Hair	Member of the Tribe	Shaftesbury Theatre	
1973–1974	Grease	Sandy	New London Theatre	
1974–1975	Billy	Rita	Theatre Royal, Drury Lane	
1975–1976	The Boy Friend	Maisie	Haymarket Theatre, Leicester	
1978–1980	Evita	Eva Perón	Prince Edward Theatre	Won: Laurence Olivier Award for Best Performance in a Musical; Won: Society of West End Theatre Award for Best Actress in a Musical; Won: Variety Club Award for Showbusiness Personality of the Year
1981–1982	Cats	Grizabella	New London Theatre	
1983–1984	Abbacadabra	Miss Williams / Carabosse	Lyric Theatre, Hammersmith	1984: Rear of the Year Award
1986–1987	Chess	Florence Vassy	Prince Edward Theatre	Variety Club Award for Recording Artiste of the Year; Nomination: Laurence Olivier Award for Best Actress in a Musical; Head of the Year Award
1989–1990	Anything Goes	Reno Sweeney	Prince Edward Theatre	Nomination: Laurence Olivier Award for Best Actress in a Musical
1993–1994	Piaf	Édith Piaf	Piccadilly Theatre	Gold Badge of Merit Award BASCA; Nomination: Laurence Olivier Award for Best Actress in a Musical
1994, 1995–1996, 1996–1997	Sunset Boulevard	Norma Desmond	Adelphi Theatre (West End); Minskoff Theatre (Broadway)	Variety Club Award – Best Actress of the Year; Officer of the Order of the British Empire (OBE) Queen's Birthday Honours; Nomination: Laurence Olivier Award for Best Actress in a Musical; HMV Lifetime Achievement
1998	The Misanthrope	Célimène	Piccadilly Theatre	Lifetime Achievement National Operatic and Dramatic Association
2000–2001	The King and I	Anna Leonowens	London Palladium	
2003	Where There's a Will	Angèle	Yvonne Arnaud Theatre; Theatre Royal, Brighton	
2004	Sweeney Todd: The Demon Barber of Fleet Street	Mrs. Lovett	New York City Opera	Nomination: Drama Desk Award for Outstanding Actress in a Musical
2007	The Drowsy Chaperone	The Drowsy Chaperone / Beatrice Stockwell	Novello Theatre	Nomination: What'sOnStage Award for Best Supporting Actress in a Musical
2011–2012	Follies	Carlotta Campion	Kennedy Center (Washington DC); Marquis Theatre (Broadway); Ahmanson Theatre (Los Angeles)	Nomination: Drama Desk Award for Outstanding Featured Actress in a Musical; Nomination: Grammy Award for Best Musical Theater Album
2017–2018	Dick Whittington	Queen Rat	London Palladium	
2020	Pantoland	Queen Rat	London Palladium	

== Discography ==
- Sitting Pretty (1978)
- Elaine Paige (1981)
- Stages (1983)
- Cinema (1984)
- Love Hurts (1985)
- Christmas (1986)
- The Queen Album (1988)
- Love Can Do That (1991)
- Romance & the Stage (1993)
- Piaf (1994)
- Essential Musicals (2006)
- Elaine Paige and Friends (2010)
- Miscellaneous Paige (2026)
