= Mireille Mathieu discography =

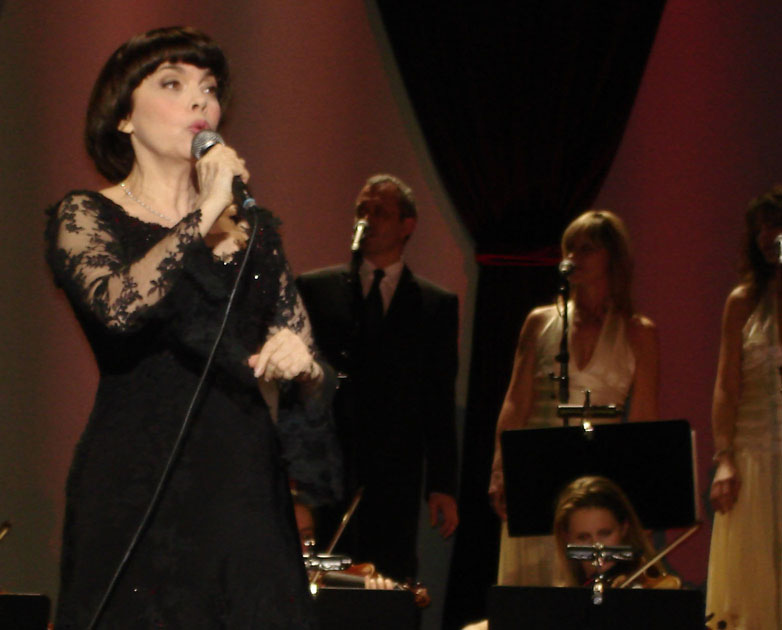
- Mathieu in Cologne, Germany, 2008
- Studio albums: 75
- Live albums: 6
- Compilation albums: 30
- Singles: 118
- Songs: 944
- Songs in French: 566
- Songs in German: 273
- Songs in English: 53
- Songs in Spanish: 37
- Songs in Italian: 15

This article presents the discography of the French singer Mireille Mathieu.

== Albums ==
Year	Album	Country	Notes
1966	En Direct de L'Olympia	France	Barclay 80330 S
1967	Made in France	France	
1967	En Direct De L'Olympia 1967	France	
1968	Le merveilleux petit monde de Mireille Mathieu chante Noël	France	Christmas album
1969	La première étoile	France	
1969	Sweet Souvenirs of Mireille Mathieu	France	
1969	Olympia	France	
1969	Mireille... Mireille	Germany	First German album - fold-out cover
1970	Mireille... Mireille	France	
1970	Merci Mireille	Germany	
1971	Bonjour Mireille	France	
1971	Mireille Mathieu en concert au Canada	Canada	Live recording
1972	Mireille Mathieu chante Francis Lai	France	
1972	J'étais si jeune	France	
1972	Meine Träume	Germany	
1972	Mes premières chansons	Canada	
1973	Olympia	France	
1973	L'amour et la vie	France	
1974	Und der Wind wird ewig singen	Germany	
1974	Le vent de la nuit	France	
1974	Mireille Mathieu chante Ennio Morricone	France	
1974	Mireille Mathieu en concert à Byblos	Lebanon	Live recording
1975	Apprends-moi	France	
1975	Rendezvous mit Mireille	Germany	
1975	Wünsch Dir was – Eine musikalische Weltreise mit Mireille Mathieu	Germany	
1975	On ne vit pas sans se dire adieu (Polydor 2490 128)	Canada	
1976	Et tu seras poète	France	
1976	Herzlichst Mireille	Germany	
1976	Und wieder wird es Weihnachtszeit	Germany	Christmas album
1977	Sentimentalement vôtre	France	
1977	Die schönsten deutschen Volkslieder	Germany	
1977	Der Rhein und Das Lied von der Elbe	Germany	
1977	Das neue Schlager-Album	Germany	
1977	Es ist Zeit für Musik	Germany	ZDF-Show recording
1978	Fidèlement vôtre	France	
1978	J'ai peur d'aimer un souvenir	Japan	
1978	Alle Kinder dieser Erde	Germany	
1979	Mireille Mathieu Chante Paul Anka: Toi et Moi	France	
1979	Mireille Mathieu Sings Paul Anka	World	
1979	Romantiquement vôtre	France	
1979	So ein schöner Abend	Germany	
1980	Un peu... beaucoup... passionnément	France	
1980	Gefuhle	Germany	
1980	30 Favoritas de Mireille	Mexico	album 3 lp's avec Madrecita del Niños dios
1981	Bravo tu as gagné	Japan	
1981	Je vous aime…	France	
1981	Die Liebe einer Frau	Germany	
1982	Trois milliards de gens sur terre	France	
1982	Ein neuer Morgen	Germany	
1982	Bonsoir Mireille	Germany	ZDF-Show recording
1983	Je veux l'aimer	France	
1983	Nur für dich	Germany	
1984	Chanter	France	
1984	Los cuentos de cri cri	Mexico	
1984	The tales of cri cri	USA	
1985	Les contes de Cri-Cri	France	
1985	La demoiselle d'Orléans	France	
1985	Les grandes chansons françaises	France	
1985	Welterfolge aus Paris	Germany	German-language version of 'Les grandes chansons françaises'
1986	In Liebe Mireille	Germany	
1986	Après toi	France	
1986	French Collection	USSR	
1987	Rencontres de femmes	France	
1987	Tour de L'Europe	Germany	
1988	Mireille Mathieu à Moscou	USSR	Live recording
1989	L'Américain	France	
1989	Embrujo [Himno al amor, 1990]	Spain	Spanish-language album
1990	Ce soir je t'ai perdu	France	
1991	Una mujer	Spain	Spanish-language album
1991	Mireille Mathieu - Que Pour Toi	France	
1993	Mireille Mathieu chante Piaf	France	
1993	Unter dem Himmel von Paris	Germany	German-language version of 'Mireille Mathieu chante Piaf'
1995	Vous lui direz	France	
1996	In meinem Traum	Germany	
1999	Alles nur ein Spiel	Germany	
2002	De tes mains	France	
2005	Une place dans mon coeur	France	
2006	Films et Shows	France	
2007	In Meinem Herzen	Germany	
2009	Nah Bei Dir	Germany	
2013	Wenn mein Lied deine Seele küsst	Germany	
2014	Une vie d'amour	France	Best of compilation - 3 CDs
2015	Noël	France	

== Singles ==
- 1966 – C'est ton nom
- 1966 – Un homme et une femme
- 1966 – Paris en colère
- 1966 – Qu'elle est belle
- 1966 – Mireille Mathieu
- 1966 – Qu'elle est belle
- 1966 – Celui que j'aime
- 1966 – Mon credo
- 1967 – Adieu à la nuit
- 1967 – La dernière valse
- 1967 – Quand tu t'en iras
- 1967 – Quand on revient
- 1967 – Nous on s'aimera
- 1967 – Un monde avec toi
- 1968 – Ensemble
- 1968 – Sweet souvenirs of Stefan
- 1968 – El último vals
- 1968 – Una canzone
- 1968 – Mon credo
- 1968 – L'amour est passé
- 1968 – Quand fera-t-il jour camarade
- 1969 – Hinter den Kulissen von Paris
- 1969 – La première étoile
- 1969 – Une simple lettre
- 1969 – Mon bel amour d'éte
- 1969 – La première étoile
- 1969 – Tarata-ting, tarata-tong
- 1969 – Toi, moi, nous
- 1970 – An einem Sonntag in Avignon
- 1970 – Scusami se
- 1970 – Es geht mir gut, cheri
- 1970 – Das Wunder aller Wunder ist die Liebe
- 1970 – Donne ton cœur, donne ta vie
- 1970 – C'est dommage
- 1970 – Mon amour me revient
- 1970 – Ganz Paris ist ein Theater
- 1971 – Pardonne-moi ce caprice d'enfant
- 1971 – Une histoire d'amour
- 1971 – Mille fois bravo
- 1971 – Le casse
- 1971 – Der pariser Tango
- 1971 – Akropolis adieu
- 1971 – Liebe kennt nur der, der sie verloren hat
- 1971 – Regen ist schön
- 1971 – Meine Welt ist die Musik
- 1971 – Nimm noch einmal die Gitarre
- 1971 – Die Kinder von Montparnasse
- 1972 – Quando verranno i giorni
- 1972 – J'étais si jeune
- 1972 – Corsica
- 1972 – Un jour tu reviendras
- 1972 – Und der Wind wird ewig singen
- 1972 – Roma, Roma, Roma
- 1972 – Hans im Glück
- 1972 – Korsika
- 1972 – En frappant dans nos mains
- 1973 – La paloma, adieu
- 1973 – Paris perdu
- 1973 – Emmène-moi demain avec toi
- 1975 – Apprends-moi
- 1975 – On ne vit pas sans se dire adieu
- 1975 – Tarata-ting, tarata-tong
- 1975 – Addio
- 1975 – Paris vor hundert Jahren
- 1975 – Inutile de nous revoir
- 1975 – La marche de sacco et vanzetti
- 1975 – Aloa-he
- 1975 – Der Zar und das Mädchen
- 1976 – Aber heidschi bumbeidschi
- 1976 – La vie en rose
- 1976 – Ciao bambino, sorry
- 1976 – Ma mélodie d'amour
- 1976 – Der wein war aus Bordeaux
- 1976 – Kleine Schwalbe
- 1977 – Mille colombes
- 1978 – Santa Maria de la mer
- 1978 – A blue bayou
- 1978 – Alle Kinder dieser Erde
- 1978 – Chante pour le soleil
- 1979 – Mireille Mathieu chante Noël
- 1979 – Un enfant viendra
- 1979 – Zuhause wartet Natascha
- 1979 – Un enfant viendra
- 1980 – Une femme amoureuse
- 1980 – Chicano
- 1980 – Les pianos du Paradis
- 1980 – Tage wie aus Glas
- 1980 – Mamy oh mamy
- 1981 – Mireille Mathieu
- 1981 – Bravo tu as gagné
- 1981 – Du mußt mir gar nichts von Liebe sagen
- 1981 – Die liebe einer Frau
- 1981 – Une vie d'amour
- 1981 – Promets-moi
- 1982 – Die liebe zu dir
- 1982 – Vai Colomba Bianca
- 1983 – Together We're Strong (with Patrick Duffy)
- 1983 – Eternellement amoureuse
- 1983 – Nur für dich
- 1984 – Good bye my love
- 1984 – Mon amour
- 1984 – Zurück zur Zärtlichkeit
- 1984 – On est bien
- 1985 – Ich schau' in deine Augen
- 1985 – Don't talk to me of love
- 1986 – Du weißt doch, ich lieb dich
- 1986 – Lieben heißt für mich, mit dir zu leben
- 1987 – Rencontres de femmes
- 1987 – Nie war mein Herz dabei
- 1988 – L'enfant que je n'ai jamais eu
- 1989 – L'américain
- 1993 – Schau mich bitte nicht so an
- 1996 – In meinem Traum
- 1996 – Feuer im Blut
- 2002 – Aujourd'hui je reviens
