= List of songs recorded by Mireille Mathieu =

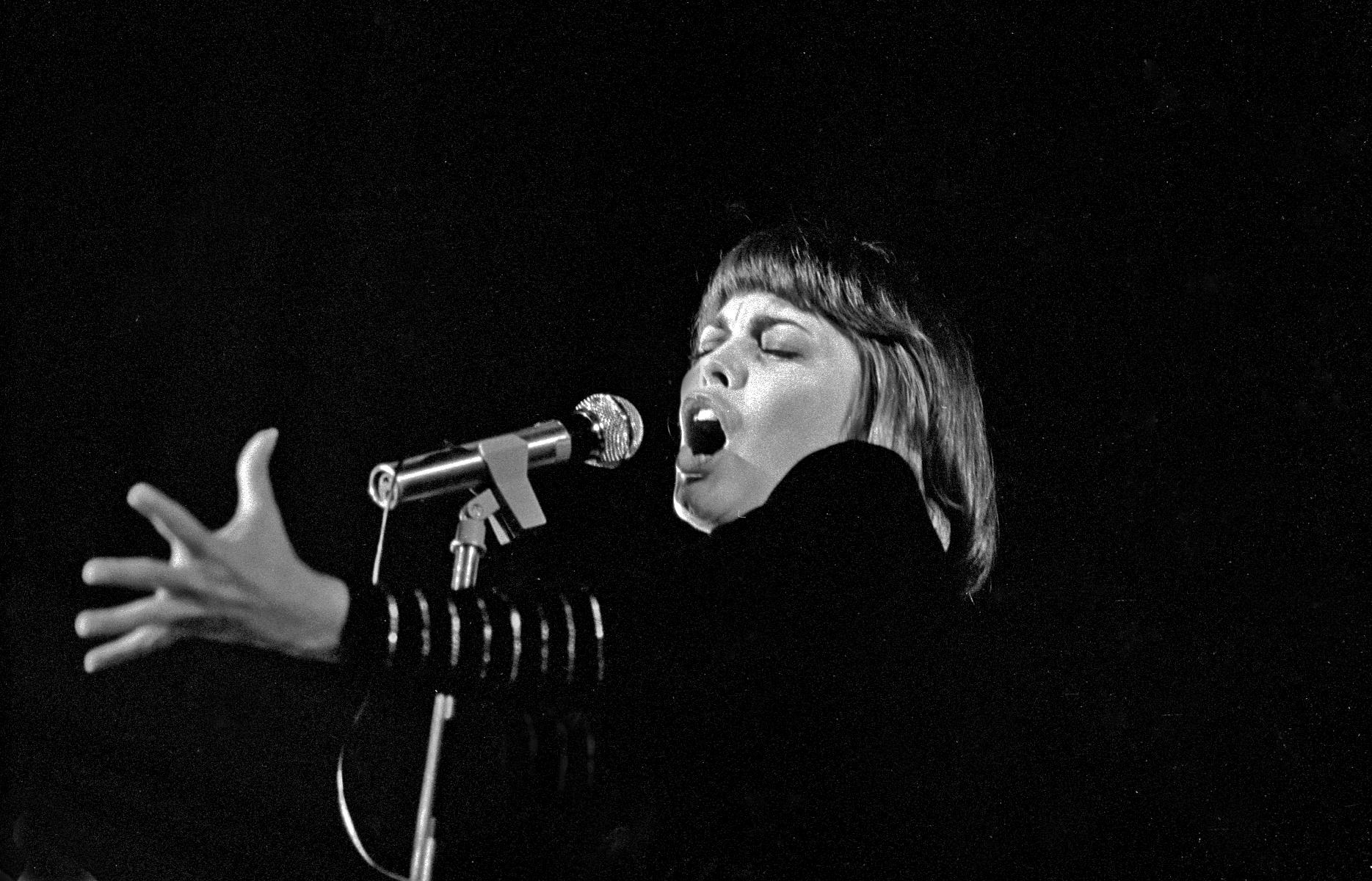
Mathieu in 1971

This is the list of songs performed by the French singer Mireille Mathieu.

== French ==
Year	Title	Duo Singer	Music Author	Lyric Author	Label
1978	A Blue Bayou		Roy Orbison, Joe Melson	Roy Orbison, Joe Melson	
1971	Acropolis Adieu		Georg Buschor	Christian Bruhn	Ariola
1967	Alors Nous Deux			Gilbert Guenet, Jean Setti (Jil et Jan)	
1977	Amour Défendu (Jeux Interdits)				
2012	A Quoi Ça Sert L'Amour		Michel Emer	Michel Emer	Ariola
2008	Bonsoir l'Artiste				Ariola
1981	Bravo, tu as Gagné (Winner Takes it All)		Benny Andersson, Björn Ulvaeus	Charles Level	Ariola
	Caruso				
1978	C'est si bon	Petula Clark	Henri Betti	André Hornez	
1966	C'est ton Nom				Barclay
1971	C'était dimanche				
1967	Ce soir ils vont s'Aimer		Christian Gaubert	Pierre-André Dousset	
1966	Celui que j'Aime				
	Chant des partisans				
1976	Ciao Bambino, Sorry		Pierre Delanoë, Salvatore Cutugno, Vito Pallavicini		Philips
1972	Comme deux trains dans la nuit				
1985	Comme d'Habitude (My Way)		Claude François, Gilles Thibaut	Claude François, Jacques Revaux	Ariola, PolyTel
1977	Des Prières				
1970	Donne ton Cœur, Donne ta Vie			Patricia Carli	
1967	En Chantant French-Music			Gilles Ginsbourg, Francis Fumière	
1972	En Frappant dans nos mains				
1972	À Quoi Tu Penses, Dis		Francis Lai	Catherine Desage	Barclay
1968	Ensemble				
	Éternellement amoureuse (Forever in Love)			Hugh Martin, Ralph Blane	
1976	Et Tu Seras Poète		Tony Rallo	Jean-Pierre Lang, Roland Vincent	
1993	Exodus Theme		Ernest Gold/Eddy Marnay translation		
1974	Folle, Follement Heureuse (Grande grande grande)		A. Testa, T. Renis	Charles Aznavour	
1967	Géant				
1980	Hello Taxi				
	J'ai raison de t'Aimer				
1967	J'ai Gardé l'Accent		Gaston Bonheur	Jean Bernard	
1974	Jambalaya				
1967	Je ne suis rien sans toi (I'm Coming Home)		André Pascal	Les Reed	Barclay
	Je suis revenue vers toi		Les Reed	André Pascal	Barclay
1985	Je suis seule ce soir				
1978	Je t'aime avec ma peau				
1975	Je Veux t'Aimer Comme Une Femme (Ain't No Way to Treat a Lady)			Harriet Schock, Eddy Marnay	
1993	Jezebel		Edith Piaf, Charles Aznavour		
1968	L'amour Est Passé (Love Has Passed You By)		Pierre Michelangeli	Les Reed	
1989	L'Américain		Didier Barbelivien		
1991	l'Enfant de l'Irlande (Danny Boy)				
1988	l'Enfant Que Je n'Ai Jamais Eu		Paul Auriat	Didier Barbelivien	
1980	La Ballade des Gens Heureux	Gérard Lenorman		Pierre Delanoë	
1967	La Chanson de Notre Amour				
	La Chansons des Souvenirs (Song Of A Thousand Voices)				
1985	La demoiselle d'Orléans			Pierre Delanoë, Jean-Pierre Bourtayre, Jacques Revaux	Ariola
1966	La dernière valse				Barclay
1988	La Marseillaise				
2002	La Même Histoire				
1985	La Mer (The Sea)			Charles Trenet	
1973	La Paloma Adieu (La Paloma 1863)			Sebastián Iradier	
1969	La première étoile		Paul Mauriat	André Pascal	
2002	La Quête (The Impossible Dream-The Quest)		Mitch Leigh	Joe Darion, Jacques Brel	
1973	La Terre Promise		Christian Bruhn	Traditional, Catherine Desage	
1976	La Vie en Rose		Marcel Louiguy	Marcel Louiguy, Edith Piaf	Philips
1967	La vieille barque				
1966	Le Funambule			Jacques Plante	
1977	Le vieux café de la Rue d'Amérique				
1968	Les Bicyclettes de Belsize				Barclay
1967	Les Yeux de l'Amour (The Look of Love)		Burt Bacharach, Hal David	Gérard Sire	Barclay
1976	Ma Melodie d'Amour				
1982	Ma Vie m'Appartient				
1985	Made in France				
1981	Mais toi				
	Me Soir de Blues				
1977	Mille Colombes		Christian Bruhn	Eddy Marnay	Philips
1968	Minuit Chrétiens	Roger Mathieu			Barclay
1969	Mon bel amour d'été				
1968	Mon Copain Pierrot		Sacha Distel, Gérard Gustin	Jean Broussolle	Barclay
1966	Mon Credo		Paul Mauriat	André Pascal	Barclay
	Mon Père				
1966	Mr. Jack Hobson			Gilbert Guenet, Jean Setti (Jil et Jan)	Barclay
1980	New York, New York				
1985	Non, je ne regrette rien				
1982	Nos souvenirs				
1975	On ne vit pas sans se dire adieu (When a Child is Born)		Henri Dijan	Ciro Dammicco	
1970	Pardonne-moi ce caprice d'enfant		Patricia Carli	Patricia Carli	
1966	Paris en colère		Maurice Jarre	Maurice Vidalin	Barclay
1968	Petit Papa Noël				
1967	Pour un cœur sans amour		Francis Lai	Michèle Vendôme	
1970	Pourquoi le monde est sans amour		Patricia Carli	Patricia Carli	
	Quand on n'a que l'Amour				
1967	Quand On Revient (When You Return French Lyrics)		Paul Mauriat	André Pascal	Barclay
1967	Quand tu t'en iras (Non Pensare A Me, Time Alone Will Tell)		E. Sciozilli	Jacques Plante	Barclay
1966	Qu'elle est belle (Rusty Bells)		Eddie Snyder	French lyrics Pierre Delanoë and Franck Gérald, Original Eddie Snyder, Richard Ahlert	Barclay
2005	Rien de l'Amour				
1973	Sahara				
1978	Santa Maria de la Mer			Eddy Marnay	
1967	Seuls au Monde		Paul Mauriat	André Pascal	Barclay
1970	Toi que j'aimerai		Fred Farrugia, Jean-Claude Oliver	Eddy Marnay	Ariola
2005	Ton nom est ma seule prière			Julien Melville, Patrick Hampartzoumian	
1975	Tous les enfants chantent avec moi				
1982	Trois milliards de gens sur terre (Battle Hymn)			Traditional, Eddy Marnay	
1982	Tu n'as pas quitté mon cœur				
1974	Un éléphant sur la Tamise (An Elephant on the Thames)			Pierre-André Dousset, Pete Bellotte, Giorgio Moroder	
1971	Un jour viendra (A Day will Come)		Francis Lai	Catherine Desage	
1974	Un Jour Tu Reviendras		Ennio Morricone	Alain Lacour, Maria Travia	Ariola
1966	Un homme et une femme		Frances Lai	Pierre Barouh	
1967	Un monde avec toi (The World We Knew (Over and Over))			Bert Kaempfert, Herbert Rehbein, Carl Sigman, Charles Aznavour	
2005	Un peu d'espérance				
1968	Una canzone				
1971	Une Histoire d'Amour		Francis Lai	Catherine Desage	
1969	Une simple lettre				
1980	Une femme amoureuse				
2005	Une place dans mon cœur			Julien Melville, Patrick Hampartzoumian	
1980	Une Vie D'amour	Charles Aznavour	Georges Garvarentz	Charles Aznavour	
1966	Viens dans ma rue		Paul Mauriat	André Pascal	Barclay
1995	Vous lui direz		Noam Kaniel	Michel Jourdan, Michel Amsellem, Roger Loubet	

== German ==
Year	Title	Duo Singer	Music Author	Lyric Author	Label
	Akropolis adieu				
	Alles nur ein Spiel				
	An einem Sonntag in Avignon				
	Au Revoir Mon Amour				
	Der Pariser Tango				
	Der traurige Tango				
	Der Zar und das Mädchen				
	Die Liebe zu Dir (Chariots of Fire)				
	Die Weisse Rose				
	Ein Land ist mein				
	Ein Romantischer Mann		Christian Bruhn	Wolfgang Hofer	
	Es geht mir gut, Chéri				
	Es ist Eine Rose Entsprungen				
	Feuer im Blut				
	Ganz Paris ist ein Theater				
	Hans im Glück				
	Heute bin ich so verliebt				
1969	Hinter den Kulissen von Paris		Christian Bruhn	Georg Buschor	
	In meinem Herzen				
	In meinem Traum				
	Keiner war vor Dir wie Du				
	Korsika				
	La Paloma ade				
	Liebe Lebt				
	Martin				
	Meine Welt ist die Musik				
	Merci, Antonio				
	Nimm noch einmal die Gitarre				
	Nur der Himmel war Zeuge				
	Nur für Dich				
	Roma, Roma, Roma				
	Santa Maria				
	Schau mich bitte nicht so an				
	Tarata-Ting, Tarata-Tong				
	Und der Wind wird ewig singen				
	Vor Einem Jahr				
	Wie soll ich Leben ohne Dich				
	Wie war Deine Leben				
	Winter im Canada				
	Wolke im Wind				

== Italian ==
(Most Italian-language Mireille songs are conducted by Paul Mauriat, some are conducted by Ennio Morricone with whom she recorded the album "Mireille Mathieu chante Ennio Morricone" in 1974.

Year	Title	Duo Singer	Music Author	Lyric Author	Label
	Adesso Volo				
	Attore (Mille fois bravo)				
	Caruso				
	Cera una volta terra mia				
	Dal quel sorriso che non ride più				
	Donna senza età				
	Gli occhi del Amore				
	La donna madre				
	Laschia ch'io pianga				
	Nata Libera				
	Non pensare a me				
	Quando verranno i giorni				
	Roma Roma Roma				
	Scusa mi sei				
	Stassera sentirai una Canzone				
	Un Fuoco				
	Vola, Vola				
	Vivrò per te				

== Spanish ==
Year	Title	Duo Singer	Music Author	Lyric Author	Label
1974	Acrópolis Adiós				
1981	Acrópolis Adiós				
	Arde París				
	Caruso				
	Creo que va a volver				
	El viejo amor				
	El amor es uno				
	Embrujo Capricho Árabe				
	Gotas de lluvia				
	Himno a la alegría				
	Himno al Amor				
	La Paloma Vendra				
	La vida en rosa				
	Mañana				
	Mi confesion				
	Nostalgia				
	Por tu amor				
	Rin Rin				
	Santa Maria del Mar				
1980	Santa María Versión Madrecita del niño Dios				
	Señor (Mon Dieu)				
	Siempre Amor				
	Solamente Una Vez (Lara)				
	Tal vez amor				
	Tres campanas				
	Una Mujer				
	Viento				
	Vivir de Sueños				

== Catalan ==
Year	Title	Duo Singer	Music Author	Lyric Author	Label
	El cant dels ocells (El canto de los pájaros)				

== Songs in various languages ==
This list contains songs who are sung in at least two languages.
The year shows in which a song was first published.

Song in English language	Song in French language	Song in German language	Song in Italian language	Song in Spanish language	year	Other
Sometimes	Ensemble	-	-	-	1968	
Underneath the Bridges of the Seine	L'amour de Paris	Hinter den Kulissen von Paris	-	-	1969	
Acropolis adieu	Acropolis adieu	Akropolis adieu	-	-	1971	
-	Bonsoir l'artiste	An einem Sonntag in Avignon	-	-	1971	
-	Amour défendu	Walzer der Liebe	-	-	1977	
-	C'est si bon	C'est si bon (So fühlt man in Paris)	-	-	1985	
-	Comme d'habitude	So leb dein Leben	-	-	1985	
-	La Mer	Das Meer	-	-	1985	
-	L'accordéoniste	Der Akkordeonspieler	-	-	1993	
-	Hymne à l'amour	Hymne an die Liebe	-	-	1985	
-	Je suis seule ce soir	Nachts bin ich allein	-	-	1985	
-	Jezebel	Jezebel	-	-	1993	
-	Jusqu'à Pearlydam	Pearlydumm	-	-	1980	
-	L'accordéoniste	Der Akkordeonspieler	-	-	1993	
-	L'autre	Worte	-	-	1981	
-	La foule	Rummelplatz der Liebe	-	-	1993	
-	La Mer	Das Meer	-	-	197	
La Paloma goodbye	La Paloma adieu (1973); La paloma reviens (1983)	La Paloma ade	-	La Paloma vendra	1973	
-	La première étoile	Der Stern unserer Liebe	-	-	1969	
-	La vie en rose	Schau mich bitte nicht so an (1985)	-	La vie en rose (1991)	1976	
-	Le long de la Seine	Ein Lied aus Paris (Moulin Rouge)	-	-	1985	
-	Le premier rendez-vous	Ein bisschen Glück ist genug	-	-	1985	
-	Les feuilles mortes	Blätter im Herbst	-	-	1985	
-	Les trois cloches	Wenn die Glocken hell erklingen	-	Tres campanas (1991)	1985	
-	Milord	Die Welt ist schön, Milord	-	-	1985	
-	Mille Colombes	Nimm noch einmal die Gitarre	-	-	1977	
-	Mon Dieu	Mon Dieu	-	Señor	1990	
-	Noël blanc (1979)	Weiße Weihnacht (1976)	-	Navidades Blancas	1968	
-	Ne me quitte pas	Bitte geh nicht fort (1985)	-	-	1978	
-	Non, je ne regrette rien	Nein, es tut mir nicht leid	-	-	1985	
-	Nos souvenirs	Traumzeit	-	-	1982	
-	Padam, padam...	Padam, padam	-	-	1985	
-	Parlez-moi d'amour	Parlez-moi d'amour	-	-	1985	
-	Petit Papa Noël	Du lieber Weihnachtsmann (1976)	-	-	1968	
-	Plaisir d'amour	Plaisir d'amour (Wer wirklich liebt) (1985)	-	-	1975	
-	Promets-moi	Niemand kann mich lieben wie du	-	-	1981	
-	Roma, Roma, Roma	Roma, Roma, Roma	Roma, Roma, Roma	-	1972	
-	Santa Maria de la mer	Santa Maria	-	Santa Maria de la me (1991)	1978	
-	Tous les enfants chantent avec moi	Wenn Kinder singen	-	-	1975	
-	Tu m'apportais des fleurs	Du bringst nie mehr Blumen	-	-	1980	
-	Tu n'as pas quitté mon cœur	Doch ich habe dich geliebt	-	-	1982	
-	Un jour tu reviendras	-	C'era una volta la terra mia	-	1974	
-	-	Am Ende bleibt die Liebe (1975); Ich wär so gern noch lang bei dir (1980/2012)	-	-	1975	(1980/2012) with Frank Schöbel
