= Chansons des Cafés de Paris =

Studio album by Édith Piaf
- Released: 1950
- Recorded: February 1947
- Genre: Chanson
- Label: CID

Chansons des Cafés de Paris is a 10-inch long-playing album from Édith Piaf that was released in 1950 on the CID label (UM233118). The album was also released with the same eight tracks in the United States on the Decca label (DL6004). Piaf was accompanied on the album by Raymond Legrand et son Orchestra. Louis Untermeyer wrote the liner notes.

The songs were recorded in February 1947, after her contract with Polydor expired. She recorded 11 songs for Decca in Brussels. Ten of the songs were released on 78s in 1947 and 1948, and eight of them were compiled for release on this album. Four of the eight songs selected for the album were written by Michel Emer.

== Track listing ==
Side A

1. "Les cloches sonnent" (E. Piaf, Marguerite Monnot) [2:59]
2. "Si tu partais" (Michel Emer) [3:35]
3. "Le geste" (Michel Emer) [3:36]
4. "Sophie" (E. Piaf, Norbert Glanzberg) [4:02]

Side B

1. "Monsieur Ernest a réussi " (Michel Emer) [3:30]
2. "Monsieur X ..." (Goze, Michel Emer) [3:14]
3. "Amour Du Mois De Mai" (Wal-Berg, Jacques Larue) [2:34]
4. "Une chanson à trois temps" (Anna Marly) [4:25]
