= Chansons Parisiennes =

Studio album by Édith Piaf
- Released: January 1949
- Genre: Chanson
- Label: Columbia

Chansons Parisiennes is a collection of eight songs from Édith Piaf. The collection included "La Vie en rose" and was released on the Columbia label.

== Production and release ==
The collection was originally released in January 1949 as a bound album of four 78 RPM records. Piaf's performances were supported by orchestras conducted by Robert Chauvigny (tracks 1–3) and Guy Luypaerts (tracks 4–8).

The notes on the back cover of the album state: "For this collection Édith Piaf has chosen eight characteristic songs of the Paris streets and cabarets, each one of which tells a story or sets a rueful of sometimes happy mood."

It was reissued in 1951 as a 10-inch, long-playing record (FL 9501).

== Reception ==
On its release in January 1949, the collection received mixed reviews.

Critic Norman Johnson compared her voice to "grimy velvet", soft with "a hint of nasal scratchiness", and "when she turns it on it becomes as hard and clear as a policeman's whistle." He concluded that Piaf made 99% of America's popular singers "sound like milk-fed adolescents."

Another critic, Martin Roberts, wrote that the set "shows la Piaf in all of her many moods which range from extreme happiness to extreme grief, neither of which is vulgarly displayed."

Critic Herbert Kennedy Jr. opined: "There is a distressing uniformity both to the songs and the half-plaintive way they are sung. Piaf, however, is highly skilled in that manner so that there is a certain pleasure in hearing her."

A fourth critic wrote that Piaf sings on the collection "in the poignant style which made her a toast of French and American night clubs."

== Track listing ==
Disc 1
No.	Title	Writer(s)	Length
1.	"Les amants de Paris"	E. Marnay, Léo Ferret
2.	"Monsieur Lenoble"	Michel Emer

Disc 2
No.	Title	Writer(s)	Length
3.	"Il pleut"	Charles Aznavour, Pierre Roche
4.	"Un refrain courait dans la rue"	Édith Piaf, Chauvigny*

Disc 3
No.	Title	Writer(s)	Length
5.	"La Vie en rose"	Édith Piaf, Louiguy
6.	"C’est merveilleux"	Henri Contet, Marguerite Monnot

Disc 4
No.	Title	Writer(s)	Length
7.	"Le chant du pirate"	Henri Contet, Marguerite Monnot
8.	"Adieu mon cœur"	Henri Contet, Marguerite Monnot
