= Made in France (album) =

Studio album by Mireille Mathieu
- Released: 1968
- Genre: Chanson
- Length: 32:12
- Language: French
- Label: Barclay

Mireille Mathieu chronology
En direct de l'Olympia (1966)	Made in France (1968)	Le merveilleux petit monde de Mireille Mathieu chante Noël (1968)

Singles from Made in France
- 1. "La Dernière Valse"

Made in France (also issued as Mireille Mathieu or Magnifique!) is a studio album by French singer Mireille Mathieu, released in 1967 by Barclay Records. It was the second Mathieu's album released in the United States, by Atlantic Records.

The single "La Dernière Valse" became a European hit, reaching leading positions in Belgium, Switzerland, and France proper, where it was number one for three weeks in a row. With this single, Mathieu also entered the UK chart for the first time, at number 26.

== Critical reception ==
American music magazine Billboard's reviewer wrote that this record's appeal should reach far beyond the French speaking market. In a review of Cash Box said that "the artist waves a powerful spell with her dramatic, dynamic delivery." The reviewer of Record World magazine stated: "The acknowledged successor to Piaf's sparrow, Mathieu is a soaring dove. She's superb."

== Track listing ==
Side A
No.	Title	Writer(s)	Length
1.	"La Dernière Valse"	Hubert Ithier; Les Reed	3:06
2.	"La Vieille Barque"	André Pascal; Christian Sarrel	2:40
3.	"Quand fera-t-il jour camarade"	Gaston Bonheur; Paul Mauriat	2:39
4.	"En écoutant mon cœur chanter"	Jean Marie Blanvillain	3:06
5.	"Ponts de Paris"	Jean Peigné; Georges Garvarentz	2:26
6.	"Un monde avec toi"	Charles Aznavour; Bert Kaempfert	2:34
Total length:			16:31

Side B
No.	Title	Writer(s)	Length
1.	"Les Yeux de l'amour"	Gérard Sire; Burt Bacharach	2:53
2.	"La Chanson de notre amour"	Jean Dellème; Valto Laitinen; Pascal Sevran	2:06
3.	"Chant olympique"	Francis Lai; Pierre Barouh	2:50
4.	"Seuls au monde"	Mauriat; André Pascal	2:39
5.	"Quelqu'un pour toi"	Christian Chevallier; Frank Thomas; Jean-Michel Rivat	2:35
6.	"L'Amour"	Raymond Mamoudy; Armand Gomez	2:38
Total length:			15:41

== Personnel ==
- Mireille Mathieu – vocals
- Gérard Côte – art direction
- Paul Mauriat – conductor
  - Le Grand Orchestre Paul Mauriat – orchestra
- Gerhard Lehner – sound engineering
- Hugues Vassal – photography

Credits are adapted from the album's liner notes.
