= En direct de l'Olympia =

Studio album by Mireille Mathieu
- Released: 1966
- Genre: Chanson
- Length: 31:41
- Language: French
- Label: Barclay

Mireille Mathieu chronology
En direct de l'Olympia (1966)	Made in France (1967)

Singles from En direct de l'Olympia
- 1. "Mon credo" 2. "Qu'elle est belle" 3. "Celui que j'aime"

En direct de l'Olympia was the first album released by French singer Mireille Mathieu after her television amateur contest success in November 1965, and debut performance at the Paris Olympia in December.

The arrangements and musical direction for this album were provided by the orchestra leader and composer Paul Mauriat. Together with songwriter André Pascal, they contributed "Mon credo", "Pourquoi mon amour" and "Viens dans ma rue".

The album was published in the United States under the name The Fabulous New French Singing Star in 1966. The American edition contains five unpublished titles never released in France: "Quelque chose de merveilleux", "Je suis là", "Messieurs les musiciens", "Mr Jack Hobson" and "Je veux".

The album was awarded in HiFi Stereo Review's 1967 Record of the Year Awards, in the popular category. The prize recognized purely artistic achievements, selected by the magazine's critics based on the intrinsic merit of the works, independent of commercial success.

== Critical reception ==
The Cash Box magazine review said: "A masterful album from 19-year-old Mireille Mathieu, a relative newcomer to the French recording scene (she started a year ago.) 'Mon Credo,' 'Messieurs les musiciens,' 'Qu'elle est belle,' and 'Je suis la' are blue ribbon tracks. Set should be a fast moving item."

== Track listing ==
Original edition

1. "Mon Credo" (André Pascal, Paul Mauriat) – 2:48
2. "Celui que j'aime" (Charles Aznavour) – 2:53
3. "Est-ce que tu m'aimeras" (Jean-Loup Chauby, Bob du Pac) – 2:07
4. "Pourquoi mon amour" (André Pascal, Paul Mauriat) – 2:35
5. "Le funambule" (Jacques Plante) – 3:17
6. "Et merci quand même" (Jacques Chaumelle, Bernard Kesslair) – 2:21
7. "Viens dans ma rue" (André Pascal, Paul Mauriat) – 2:28
8. "Un homme et une femme" (Pierre Barouh, Francis Lai) – 2:53
9. "Ne parlez plus" (Gilbert Guenet, Jean Setti) – 2:48
10. "C'est ton nom" (Françoise Dorin, Francis Lai) – 2:19
11. "Ils s'embrassaient" (Serge Lebrail, Guy Magenta) – 2:38
12. "Qu'elle est belle" (Pierre Delanoë, Richard Ahlert, Eddie Snyder, Franck Gérald) – 2:34

American edition

1. "Mon Credo" (André Pascal, Paul Mauriat) – 2:48
2. "Le funambule" (Jacques Plante) – 3:17
3. "C'est ton nom" (Françoise Dorin, Francis Lai) – 2:19
4. "Ne parlez plus" (Gilbert Guenet, Jean Setti) – 2:48
5. "Quelque chose de merveilleux" (Claude Delécluse, François Rauber, Michelle-Senlis) – 3:08
6. "Messieurs les musiciens" (Guy Magenta, Pierre Delanoë) – 2:10
7. "Pourquoi mon amour" (André Pascal, Paul Mauriat) – 2:35
8. "Qu'elle est belle" (Pierre Delanoë, Richard Ahlert, Eddie Snyder, Franck Gérald) – 2:34
9. "Je suis là" (Franck Gérald, Philippe-Gérard, Arno Babajanian, Yevgeny Yevtushenko)– 3:20
10. "Ils s'embrassaient" (Serge Lebrail, Guy Magenta) – 2:38
11. "Mr. Jack Hobson" (Jil et Jan) – 2:23
12. "Je veux" (Jacques Plante, Jeff Davis) – 2:44

== Charts ==
Chart performance for En direct de l'Olympia
Chart (1967)	Peak position
German Albums (Offizielle Top 100)	14
