= Sentimentalement vôtre =

Studio album by Mireille Mathieu
- Released: 1977
- Genre: Pop, Chanson
- Length: 38:43
- Label: Philips Records/Phonogram

Mireille Mathieu chronology
Et tu seras poète (1976)	Sentimentalement vôtre (1977)	Fidèlement vôtre (1978)

Sentimentalement vôtre is the seventeenth French studio album by French singer Mireille Mathieu. It was released by Philips and published by Phonogram. It is the seventh studio album released by Philips in France. This album contains a very famous song in France, Mille colombes. Norman Parkinson was the photographer.

== Track listing ==
No.	Title	Writer(s)	Length
1.	"Le silence"	Serge Lama, Alice Dona	3:37
2.	"Sagapo"	Claude Lemesle, Sylvain Lebel, Christian Bruhn	2:57
3.	"Un oiseau chante"	Serge Lama, Alice Dona	2:48
4.	"Amour défendu"	Eddy Marnay, Christian Bruhn	3:26
5.	"Le strapontin"	Claude Lemesle, Alice Dona	2:53
6.	"Ne me quitte pas, mon amour, ne me quitte pas"	Jacques Brel, Jacques Demy, Michel Legrand	3:22
7.	"Mille colombes" (with Les petits chanteurs à la croix de Bois)	Eddy Marnay, Christian Bruhn	3:49
8.	"La tête en feu"	Claude-Michel Schönberg	3:20
9.	"Le vieux café de la rue d'Amérique"	Eddy Marnay, Vader Abraham	4:03
10.	"Des prières"	Claude Lemesle, Alice Dona	3:17
11.	"A dix-sept ans"	Eddy Marnay, Janis Ian	4:39
Total length:			38:43

== Singles ==
Two singles appeared from this album in gatefold format in France :

- 1977 Amour défendu
- 1977 Mille colombes

== Charts ==
Chart	Peak position
France	7

== Certifications and sales ==
Country	Certification	Sales certified
France	Gold	200,000
