= Johnny Stark =

French Impresario (1922–1989)

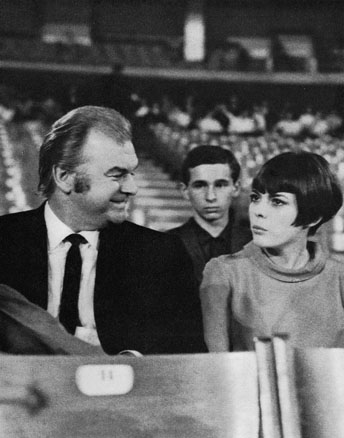
Stark with Mireille Mathieu, 1971

Johnny Stark (born Roger Oscar Emile Stark; 29 August 1922 – 24 April 1989), was a French impresario. He is perhaps best known for working with Édith Piaf and representing Mireille Mathieu from the 1960s until his death, thus assisting her rise to international stardom.

== Biography ==
Stark was born in Huningue, the son of Colonel Stark, a prominent Alsatian military figure, and a Corsican mother, born Julie Chappuit. His mother died in Nice at the age of 33 years. He lived in Corsica until the age of 11, then the French Riviera, between Cagnes-sur-Mer and Antibes. He attended school in La Bocca, Cannes. His father became a horticulturist and had property in Cagnes.

In 1941, he enlisted as a volunteer in North Africa and worked with American troops. After the Second World War, he went to Hong Kong then returned to Cannes in May 1946. On 15 August of that year, he organized "The Night of Famous Stars" at the stage of the Hespérides, in Cannes. It featured names such as Édith Piaf, Yves Montand, Lily Fayol, Reda Caire, Marie Bizet, Johnny Hess, Marcel Cerdan, Laurent Dauthuille, and Robert Charron. While the gala was a huge success, it proved a financial failure for Johnny, as he had Roland Toutain hang from one leg as a helicopter lowered him to the stage, and the stunt cost him a million francs.

Johnny Stark then organized tours with Tino Rossi, Luis Mariano, Roger Pierre and Jean-Marc Thibault, and was responsible for scouting Gloria Lasso, Dalida and Marino Marini. He established the Théâtre de Verdure (Juan-les-Pins), where in 1947 he hired Édith Piaf. Loulou Gasté asked Stark to manage Line Renaud in 1949. Line Renaud and Gasté were married 19 December 1950, attended by Stark. In the early 1960s, Johnny Hallyday, was at the forefront of the Yé-yé movement while under the guidance of Stark.

In the 1960s, he worked with performers such as Michèle Torr, Martine Baujoud, and Mireille Mathieu, the latter of which he made into an international star between 1965 and 1989. From 1967 to 1970, Johnny Stark was also responsible for the career of singer Michel Delpech.

He suffered his first heart attack in 1972 while in Canada.

In 1976, he organized François Valéry's tour with Johnny Mathis at more than 60 venues across France.

Stark was married twice: first to Nanou Taddéi, (divorced in 1962), second to Nicole Bertho, with whom he had a daughter, Vincence, (divorced in the 1980s).

Nanou Taddéi worked for French Television Studio 102, and found out that Mireille Mathieu was in Paris on 20 November 1965 and was going to sing the following day on a competing program "Song Parade". Régis Durcourt was the talent manager (impresario) who invited Mireille to Paris to sing on the Guy Lux television program. Mathieu's parents in Avignon received a telegram instructing them to locate Mireille and have her go to Studio 102 immediately for rehearsal, which she did. Roger Lanzac then forced her to choose between the two programs, and Mathieu chose his "Game of Luck" program. Johnny Stark saw that while she was raw, she was very photogenic on television. Stark was on a first name basis with Pierre Lazareff, the founder of France Soir, which was a high circulation newspaper at that time, and Lazareff put her picture and biography on Monday's front page, forcing President de Gaulle's story below the fold. Together, Stark and Lazareff would often try some of the London tabloid techniques on the Parisians. Stark devoted the next two years to Mathieu's apprenticeship by their constant touring.

Starting in 1967 Johnny became a record producer, with the name Les Editions Banco, and Les Editions Musicales.

Mireille Mathieu was selling records by the truckload, however they were only getting 3%. They were making the songwriters wealthy while they worked themselves to death touring. By becoming a producer he was able to negotiate with the songwriters and musicians to increase the percentage for himself and Mireille to 33%, or under French law 4/12 split three ways between author, composer, and publisher. He made exceptions to songwriters who could produce million seller records, and some of the songs had become mere filler and un-listenable even with Mireille's voice.

Many people thought Johnny Stark was born in America. He was often referred to as l'Américain. The nickname comes from his manner, which was non-French. He spoke many languages, and was very intense in business matters. Both Mireille Mathieu and her father also thought he was American, and Johnny was surprised when Mireille's little brothers called him Cowboy. He had a very distinctive birthmark on his left cheek, that he never had removed.

The name of Johnny Stark is related to the history of the Colmar Music Festival. He was reportedly responsible for introducing the Wine Fair which in its heyday attracted some 150,000 people and the biggest names in music.

Johnny Stark was at work in his Wagram office in Paris, when he suffered his second heart attack that Monday morning. He was rushed by ambulance to the hospital, where he was pronounced dead. As he was divorced in the 1980s, and estranged from his family, Mireille Mathieu had his body entombed in the Mathieu family mausoleum at the Saint Véran Catholic cemetery in Avignon.

== Bibliography ==
- Mireille Mathieu (Christian Page - Brea Editions)
- Vedette à la Une - Mireille Mathieu (Vick Vance - Editions Saint-Germain-des-Prés)
- Oui, je crois (Mireille Mathieu and Jacqueline Cartier - Editions Robert Laffont)
- La Véritable Mireille Mathieu (Emmanuel Bonini - Editions Pygmalion/Flammarion)
- France Soir (articles de 1989)
