= Pardonne-moi ce caprice d'enfant =

Single by Mireille Mathieu
- Released: 1970
- Recorded: 1969
- Genre: chanson
- Label: Barclay
- Songwriter(s): Patricia Carli
- Producer(s): Gerhard Hämmerling

Audio
- "Pardonne-moi ce caprice d'enfant" on YouTube

"Pardonne-moi ce caprice d'enfant" (English translation: "Forgive me that childish vagary") is a song by French singer Mireille Mathieu, which was a summer hit in 1970.

It sold somewhere between 200,000 and 400,000 copies that year in France.

== Track listings ==
7-inch EP — Barclay 71447 (France) "Pardonne-moi ce caprice d'enfant"
No.	Title	Length
1.	"Pardonne-moi ce caprice d'enfant"	3:19
2.	"La princesse et l'amour"	3:05
3.	"Pourquoi le monde est sans amour"	2:55
4.	"L'homme oui sera mon homme"	2:45

7-inch single — Ariola 14 630 AT (Germany) "Pardonne-moi ce caprice d'enfant / Pourquoi le monde est sans amour"
No.	Title	Length
1.	"Pardonne-moi ce caprice d'enfant"	3:23
2.	"Pourquoi le monde est sans amour"	3:14

== Charts ==
Chart (1970)	Peak position
Belgium (Ultratop 50 Wallonia)	13
