= L'Accordéoniste =

Song by Édith Piaf

Single by Édith Piaf
- Language: French
- Released: 1940
- Songwriters: Michel Emer (music and lyrics)

Music video
- "L'Accordéoniste" (French TV, 1954) on YouTube

"L'Accordéoniste" is a song made famous by Édith Piaf. It was written in 1940 by Michel Emer, who then offered it to her.

== Commercial performance ==
"L'Accordéoniste" became the first million-seller in Piaf's career.

== Composition ==
The song tells a story of a prostitute who loves an accordion player (and the music he plays, namely a dance called java). Then he has to leave for the war. She finds refuge in music, dreaming about how they will live together when he comes back.

== Track listings ==
10" shellac single Polydor 524 669 (France, 1940)

1. "Escales"
2. "L'Accordéoniste"
