= Mireille Mathieu =

French singer (born 1946)

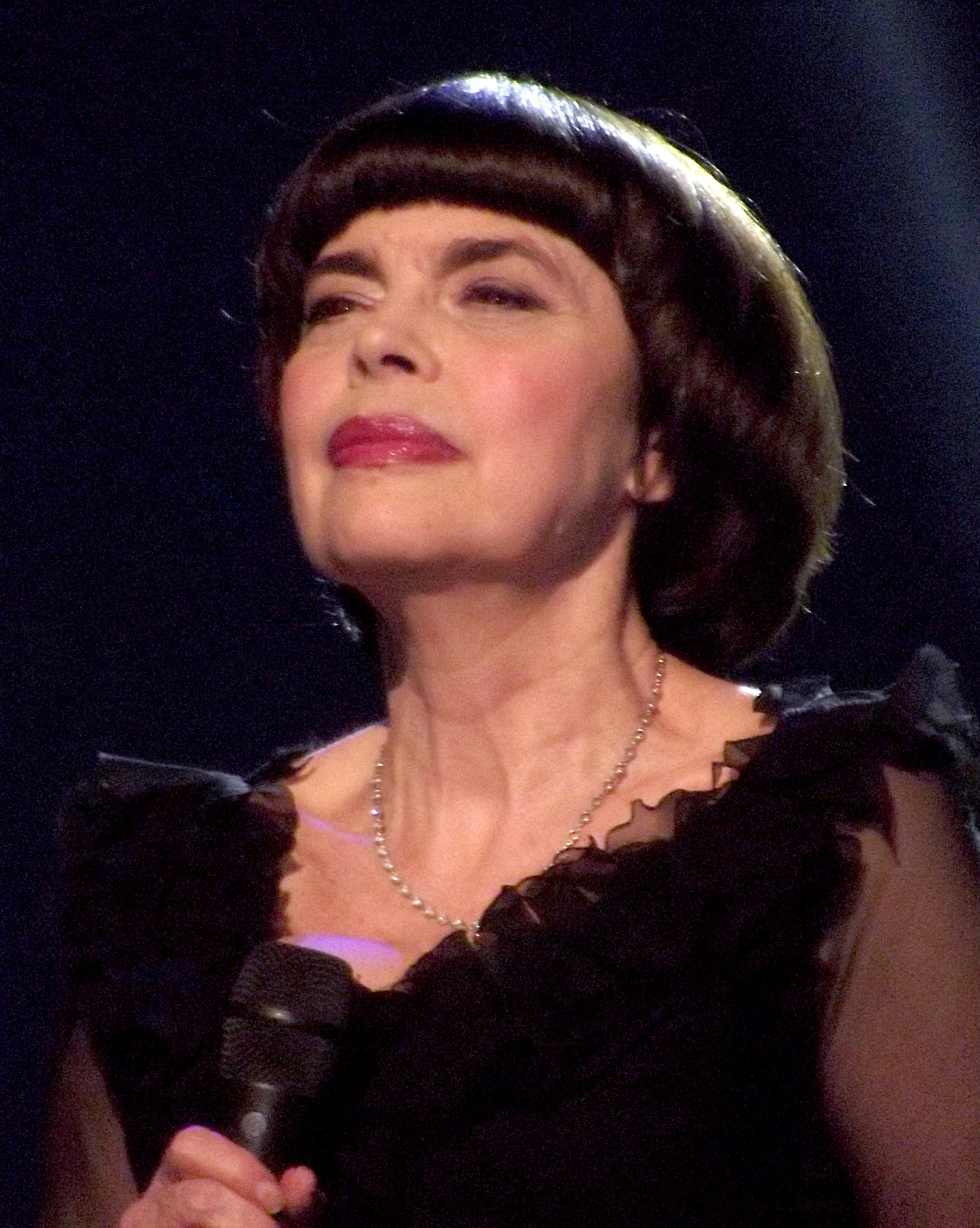
- Mathieu in 2014

Background information
- Born: 22 July 1946 (age 80); Avignon, France
- Genres: Chanson; pop standards
- Occupation: Singer
- Works: Discography; List of songs
- Years active: 1962–present
- Labels: Ariola; Metronome; Polydor; Atlantic; Capitol; Warner; Columbia; Philips; Barclay
- Website: Official website

Mireille Mathieu (French pronunciation: [miʁɛj matjø]; born 22 July 1946) is a French singer. She has recorded over 1,200 songs in eleven languages, with more than 122 million records sold worldwide.

== Biography and career ==
=== Early years ===
Mireille Mathieu was born on 22 July 1946, in Avignon, France, as the eldest daughter in a family of fourteen children; the youngest brother was born after she moved to Paris. Her father, Roger, and his family were natives of Avignon, while her mother, Marcelle-Sophie (née Poirier), was from Dunkirk. Marcelle arrived in Avignon in 1944 as a refugee from World War II after her grandmother had died and her mother went missing. Roger, along with his father, Arcade, ran the family stonemason shop just outside the main gate of Saint-Véran cemetery. The Mathieu family has been in the stonemasonry business for four generations. The shop, Pompes Funèbres Mathieu-Mardoyan, is now owned and managed by her sister Réjane's family.

The Mathieu family lived in poverty, but their living conditions improved significantly in 1954, when subsidized housing was built in the Malpeigné neighborhood near the cemetery. Then, in 1961, they moved to a larger tenement in the Croix des Oiseaux neighborhood southeast of the city.

Roger had once dreamed of becoming a singer, but his father, Arcade, disapproved, which inspired him to encourage one of his children to learn to sing with him in church. Mathieu included her father's operatic voice on her 1968 Christmas album, where it was mixed into the Minuit Chrétiens song. Mathieu's first paid performance before an audience, at age four, was rewarded with a lollipop when she sang during Midnight Mass on Christmas Eve 1950. A defining moment for her was seeing Édith Piaf sing on television.

Mathieu performed poorly in elementary school due to dyslexia, requiring an additional year to graduate. She was born left-handed, and her teachers would strike her hand with a ruler each time she was caught writing with it. She eventually became right-handed, although her left hand remains quite animated when she sings. She has an excellent memory and never uses a teleprompter on stage. Abandoning higher education at age 14 (1961), after moving to Croix des Oiseaux, she began working in a local factory in Montfavet (a suburb southeast of town), contributing to the family income and paying for her singing lessons. Popular at work, she often sang during lunch or while working. Like her parents, she is short in stature, standing at 1.52 m (5 feet) tall. Her sister Monique, born on 8 July 1947, began working at the same factory a few months later. Both sisters received bicycles on credit to commute, resulting in long days and difficult memories of riding against the mistral winds. When the factory closed, Mathieu and her two sisters (Monique and Christiane) became youth counselors at a summer camp before her rise to fame. During that summer, she had her fortune told by Tarot cards by an elderly Gypsy woman, who predicted that she would soon mingle with kings and queens.

Mathieu is Roman Catholic, and her adopted patron saint is Saint Rita, the "Saint for the Impossible". Mathieu's paternal grandmother, Germaine née Charreton, assured her that Saint Rita was the one to intercede with God for hopeless cases. Beyond religion, like many artists she holds superstitions and beliefs about luck. When asked to reveal some of her superstitions, she said: "The most important one is to never mention any of them." She has stage fright and is often seen making the sign of the cross before stepping on stage.

=== Debut (1962–1965) ===
Mathieu began her career by participating in an annual singing contest in Avignon called On Chante dans mon Quartier ("We Sing in My Neighborhood"). Photos depict the event as rather modest, with a simple curtain and one projector light. The stage was only twenty feet square, and the singer had to share it with a large piano and musicians. A large, boisterous, and mostly young audience was very much in evidence. The judges sat at a table in front of and below the elevated stage. Anyone who signed the contract in the weeks leading up to the show was allowed to perform. Talent scouts made this a worthwhile event for singers from hundreds of miles around.

Mathieu received private singing lessons from Madame Laure Collière, who was also a piano teacher in Avignon. Self-described as very stubborn in her autobiography, she wrote about singing love songs that the audience deemed inappropriate for a young girl. As a result, she lost in 1962 when she sang "Les Cloches de Lisbonne" at the first contest, and lost again in 1963 when she sang Édith Piaf's "L'Hymne à l'amour". However, in 1964, she won the event with another Piaf song, "La Vie en rose".

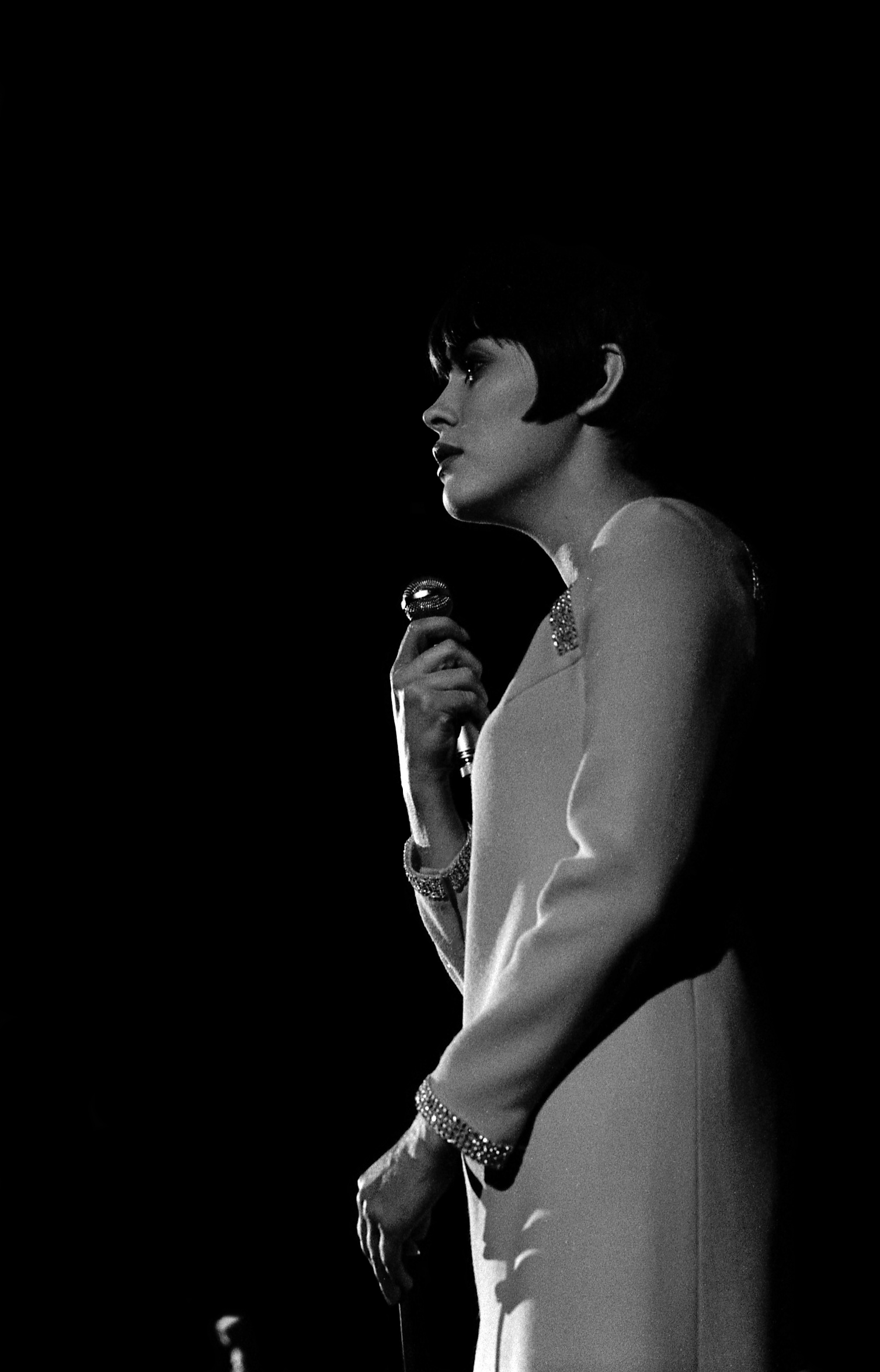
Mathieu in 1966

Her victory earned her a free trip to Paris and a pre-audition for the televised talent show Jeu de la Chance ("Game of Luck"), where amateur singers competed for audience and telephone votes. Her participation and train fare were arranged by Raoul Colombe, the deputy mayor of Avignon. Accompanied by a pianist at the studio and dressed in black like Piaf, she sang two Piaf songs for the audition judges but left dispirited: the Parisians at the studio mocked her Provençal accent, and her dyslexia caused her to mix up words. For example, her sister and current manager Monique is called "Matite" because Mathieu could not pronounce "petite" as a child.

During a 1965 summer gala, added to the Enrico Macias concert by Raoul Colombe (her first manager), Mathieu met her future manager, Johnny Stark. Mathieu and her father initially thought Stark was American, based on his name and demeanor, and they nicknamed him l'Américain. Stark had worked with artists such as Yves Montand, and the relationship between him and Mathieu is often likened to that of Colonel Tom Parker and Elvis Presley. Stark is credited with making her a star and the successor to Piaf. By 1968, under his careful management, she had become France's most popular singer.

=== Breakthrough (1965–1967) ===
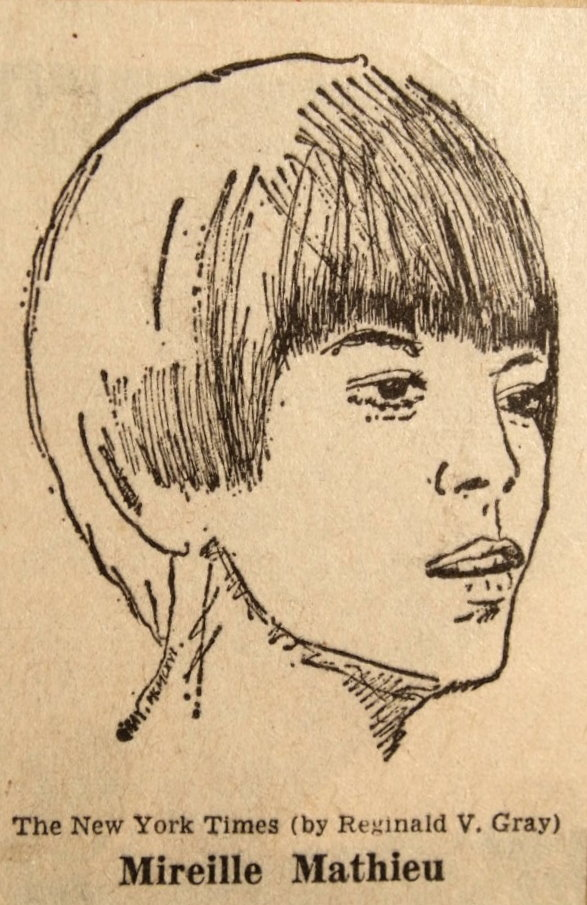
Portrait for the New York Times by Reginald Gray, 1966

Mathieu was invited to Paris by impresario Régis Durcourt to sing on the Song Parade television program on 19 November 1965. Johnny Stark had promised to write to her, but after months of waiting, she gave up on him and accepted Durcourt's offer. The exact circumstances remain unknown, but Mathieu was suddenly moved up to compete live on the Sunday, 21 November 1965 episode of Jeu de la Chance, a talent segment of the popular French program Télé-Dimanche. Stark's ex-wife, Nanou Taddéi, who worked at Studio 102, likely recognized Mathieu, as she had participated in her earlier pre-audition. Mathieu explained that Song Parade offered only one opportunity to sing, while Jeu de la Chance offered multiple chances, but only if she won, and she intended to win.

Both the studio audience and telephone voters gave her a slight lead over five-time winner Georgette Lemaire, so the producers called it a tie. Stark officially became her manager that night, and with the help of his longtime assistant Nadine Joubert, prepared Mathieu to win the contest the following week and defeat Lemaire. Stark and Lemaire had a mutual dislike.

In a short film called La guerre des Piaf (War of the Sparrows), Mathieu and Lemaire were interviewed separately, both being of the same diminutive height. Mathieu was surrounded by her sisters Monique and Christiane, with Stark hovering in the background as she faced her first on-camera interview. She appeared uncomfortable, staring at the floor during many of the questions and even looking dumbfounded at one point, until Stark finally came to her rescue. In a later interview, she emphasized the significance of the event, stating: "For me, Paris was the end of the world. I had never taken a train or seen a camera before. I did not know what the outcome of the adventure would be."

Mireille has everything to learn. How to walk, how to breathe, how to enunciate properly. But no one should ever interfere with that voice.

— Johnny Stark, 1966

In the middle of her seven consecutive performances on Télé-Dimanche, she performed a concert at the Paris Olympia, which propelled her to stardom. She signed with Bruno Coquatrix, the owner of the Olympia, on 20 December, and performed the only three Piaf songs she had memorized two days later. She was hailed in the press, in France and abroad, as the Piaf d'Avignon (Sparrow of Avignon), in reference to Piaf's nickname "Sparrow of the Streets".

All was not going well at this point. Mathieu said: "I was managed to such mimicry of my idol that I thought I was not able to do anything else. It was instantly one of the biggest disappointments of my life." Stark then abandoned the Piaf direction he was taking her in. The Olympia performance convinced a skeptical Paul Mauriat to work with Mireille, and songwriter André Pascal joined forces to develop her into a successful act. Together they wrote new modern material for her: Mon crédo, Viens dans ma rue, La première étoile, and many other hit songs. Her first album, En Direct de L'Olympia, on the Barclay label, was released in 1966. Highly acclaimed, along with the singles and EPs from it, the album made her a star outside France.

A regular early contributor of material was Francis Lai, who wrote two songs, C'est ton nom and Un homme et une femme for her first album, and who often accompanied her with his accordion on television. Her first record was recorded in the EMI studios, with Paul Mauriat's band. Mathieu's success led her record company, Barclay, to claim that they controlled 40% of the French pop record market.

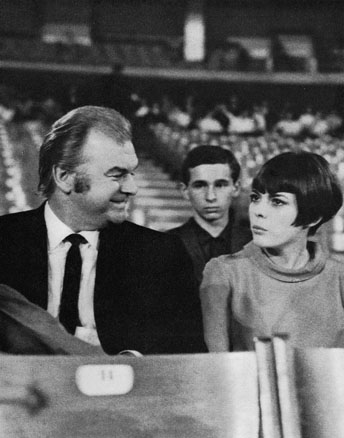
Johnny Stark and Mathieu, 1971

Mathieu spent all of 1966 and 1967 touring. It was then, during a car journey to another concert, that Stark advised Mathieu that she was finally debt-free and worth more than a million francs (US$200,000 in 1967). She had always prayed that she could get her family out of poverty, but the touring and singing were much more important at the time. In her autobiography, she stated her first major purchases were a vehicle for her father's business and a large home for her parents and siblings. Most importantly, she had a telephone installed for the family, so her parents no longer had to go to the pharmacy to talk to her while she was in Paris. Her one regret was that she was unable to see her grandmother Germaine in the hospital before she died because of all the tour contracts.

Mathieu arrived in Paris with two dresses and a change of underwear, and Stark set her up in style, sent for Mathieu's two eldest sisters, and let them go shopping for a week. He then rented her a home and a maid in the smart district of Neuilly after she had won, and made sure she only had her singing to worry about. Stark recorded all the expenses, though, and he was fully compensated before a franc was ever put in Mathieu's account.

Mathieu sang at the London Palladium during royal performances (before the Queen and her family), first in 1967, with further performances in 1969 and 1981. Following her second performance, her French cover of Engelbert Humperdinck's "The Last Waltz" (La dernière valse) generated much publicity in Great Britain and became a hit record, even though the original had been number one only a few months earlier. She also toured Canada and the United States, where she appeared on The Ed Sullivan Show and the Danny Kaye Show. While visiting Hollywood, she met Elvis Presley, and in Las Vegas, Nevada, she sang with Dean Martin and Frank Sinatra.

=== Career in the 20th century (1967–2000) ===
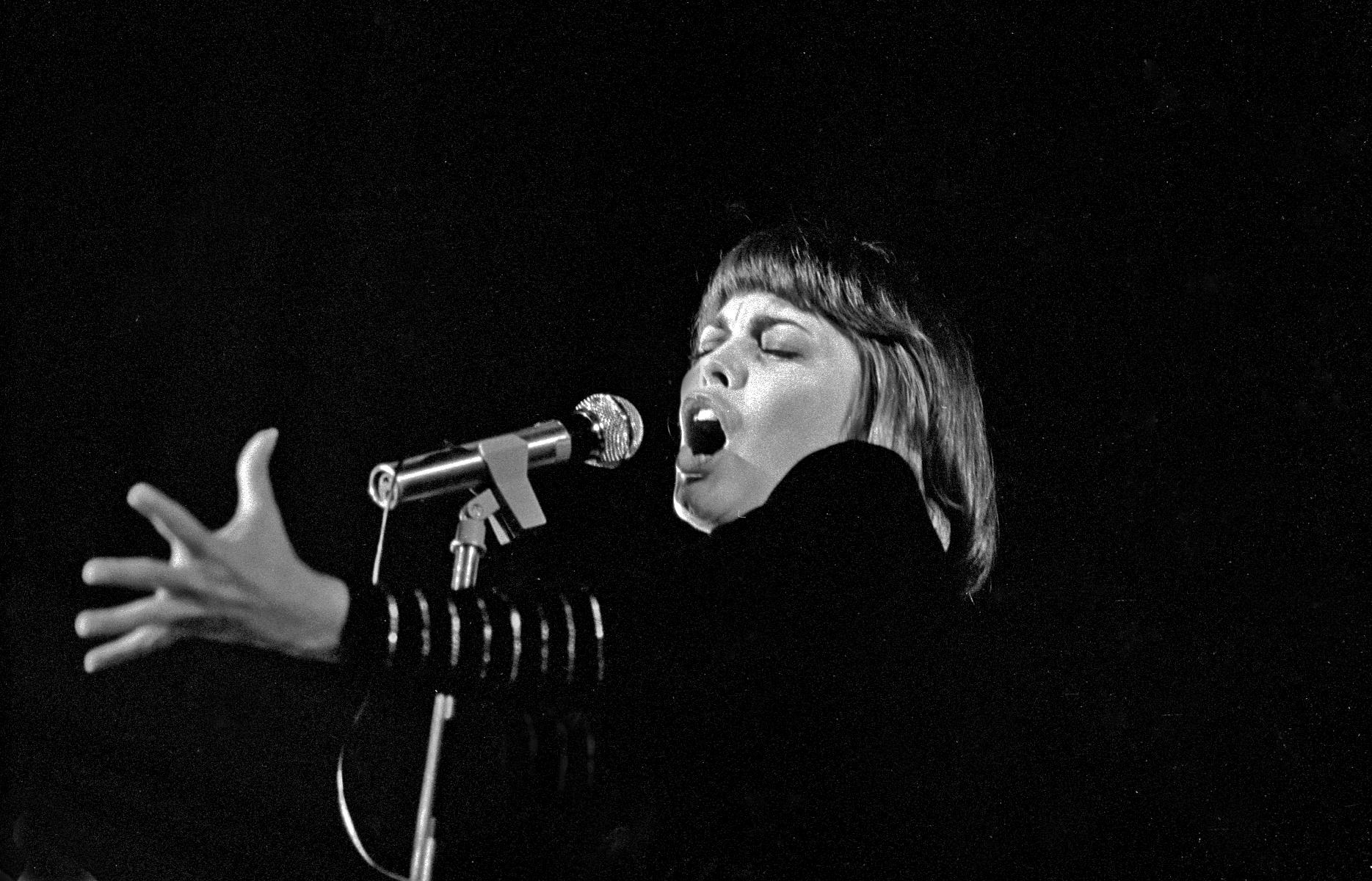
Mathieu performing in Hamburg, Germany, 1971

While on tour in February 1968, Mathieu was involved in a car accident in which she fractured one of her vertebrae; the injury incapacitated her for three months. She writes in her book that they received a note which said "we will get you next time", but it was not proven to be anything other than an accident.

In 1971, Barclay was unable to meet the demand for records. Stark then made a contract with Philips Records to issue all the singles and EPs, resulting in a million-dollar lawsuit from Barclay for breach of contract. Barclay's contract was scheduled to run until 1972.

In 1972, Mathieu toured Canada and produced a live album. Stark had his first heart attack while making arrangements for this concert.

In 1974, Mathieu formed her own publishing company, Abilene Music. Today, this company is involved in the publishing and printing of music material.

In 1983, Mathieu established another publishing company, Abilene Disc. This company is used to publish her recordings and is managed by her sisters Monique and Christiane.

In 1985, Mathieu joined Plácido Domingo in performing a children's show called The Tales of Cri-Cri. This television special featured puppets along with fifty years of traditional Mexican songs, producing popular versions in Spanish, French, and English. Mathieu's father, Roger, died this same year.

In 1986, Mathieu returned to Paris with tremendous concerts at the Palais des Congrès (more than 100,000 spectators in one month, sold-out concerts). She then performed in China, with a French television crew from TF1 filming Mireille Mathieu in China. In her autobiography, she states that she was the first Western performer to give a concert in the city, but this was in error, as at least two other Western performances preceded hers.

In 1988, W. Kordes' Söhne, a German rose-breeding company, introduced the Mireille Mathieu Rose to match her favorite lipstick color. Mathieu also published her autobiography with co-author Jacqueline Cartier. The title is Oui je crois, meaning "Yes, I Believe", which is taken from the lyrics of Mon crédo, her first recording. The book was viewed as a final chapter in her career, and Stark was also exhausted and overweight by this time. Pierre Delanoë wrote a passionate song about Joan of Arc titled La Demoiselle d'Orléans for Mathieu. The final lyric reads: "When I think of all I have given France... and she has forgotten me." She used her fists to punch the air while singing the song.

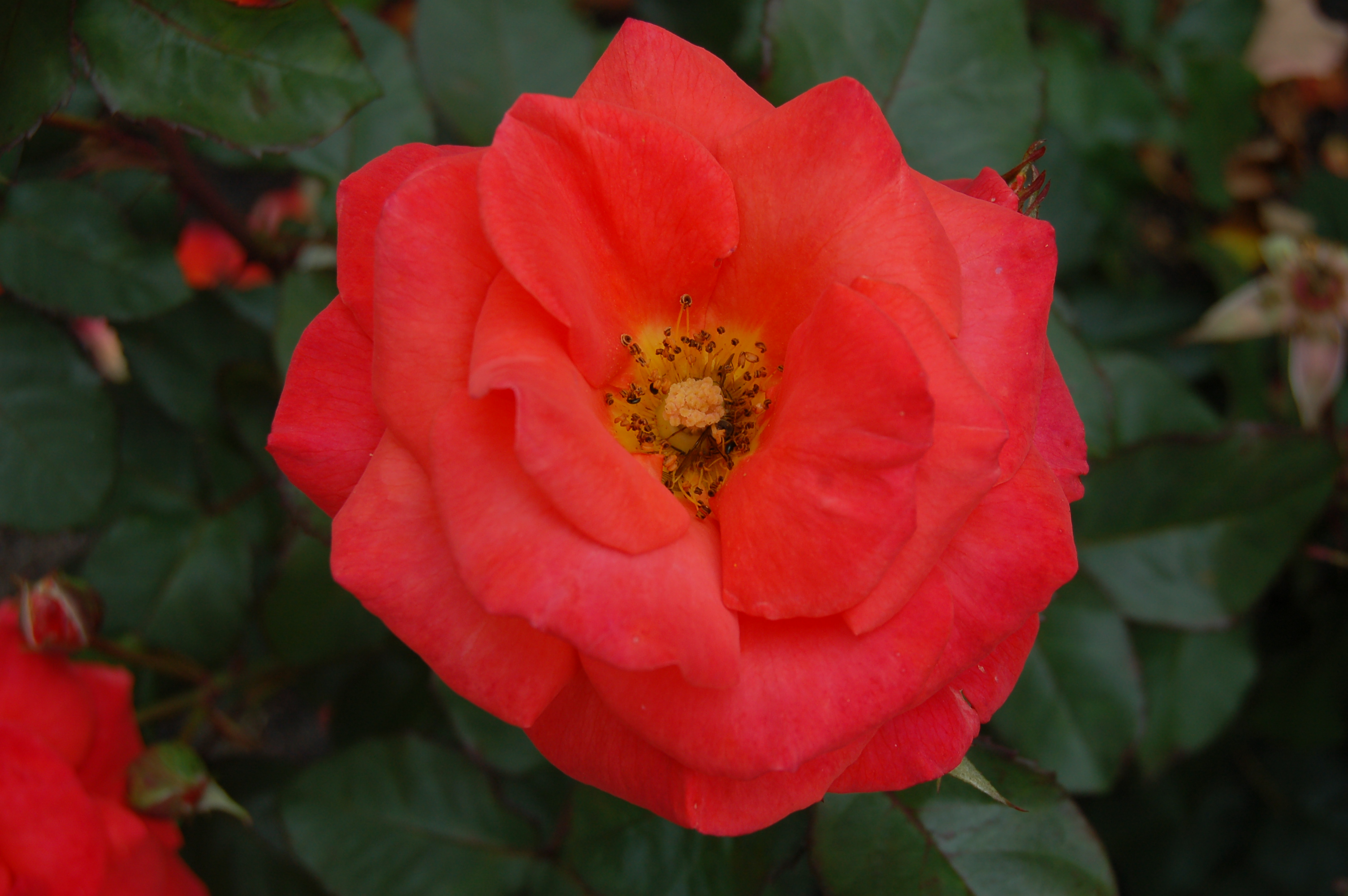
Mireille Mathieu rose

In response to accusations of being docile, Mathieu writes in her autobiography that she and Stark understood each other. She wanted to be a singer, and he was tired of people who merely sought fame. They were both hard workers, and he kept her schedule filled with lucrative contracts. She also notes that she was forbidden to read the press; however, having peeked at some of it, she was content to follow that rule. Stark, of course, had a heavy hand in manipulating the press. Mathieu recounts that her mother was often surprised to read on the front page that she was engaged to someone famous or was going to star in a movie directed by a well-known director. Her guiding principle was simply to sing and ensure that her family never returned to the tenements of Croix des Oiseaux.

Many photographs and films from the early years depict life around Stark's villa in Roquefort-la-Bédoule (south of France). The villa, also named La Bédoule, provided an escape from Paris for everyone to relax. The home supported Stark's telephone addiction, boasting 28 telephones, with each car also equipped with a phone. Mathieu lived here with her aunt Irène, and her siblings would often visit. The pool was designed to be shallow all around and deep in the center, as Mathieu had a fear of drowning and never learned to swim. The property was sold following Stark's divorce.

In 1989, President François Mitterrand invited Mathieu to sing a tribute to General Charles de Gaulle. Stark died that same year after suffering his second heart attack. Divorced and estranged from his family, Stark was entombed in the mausoleum of Mathieu in Avignon. Upon Stark's death, many remarked that no one could replace him, a sentiment that proved true; however, by that time, the entertainment press had also matured.

Stark left behind a legal "bloody mess". It took Mathieu and her lawyers years to settle and process his estate. "I was severely depressed, but I got out without needing analysis." The most controversial event of Mathieu's career, according to the media at the time, occurred when she took over Stark's office and ended her business relationship with Nadine Joubert. In an interview for Paris Match in 2002, Mathieu stated: "I realized that people I trusted stole my money, so I fired everyone!"

Mathieu's sister Monique stepped in to become her business manager. Stark wanted Pascal Auriat to succeed him, but Auriat died three months before Stark. Mathieu performed again at the Palais des Congrès in November and December 1990 with a special two-hour concert without intermission, featuring a new haircut reminiscent of Louise Brooks and a very simple black dress created by French couturier Pierre Cardin. Unfortunately, this was during the First Gulf War, resulting in fewer spectators than in 1986, and some performances had to be canceled due to insufficient ticket sales.

In 1993, she attempted a comeback with two albums devoted to her idol, Édith Piaf: Mireille Mathieu chante Piaf in French and Unter dem Himmel von Paris in German. She sold 100,000 copies of the French album, which was also available in the United States.

In November 1995, she recorded the new album Vous lui direz..., produced by Michel Jourdan for East West. The album featured new songs from a variety of authors, including Maxime Leforestier, who wrote "À la moitié de la distance" for Mathieu. She adapted this album into the German version In meinem Traum, which included two mini-CDs.

In 1998, she performed at the Olympia in Paris and released a compilation titled Son grand numéro with the new record label EMI. This compilation included a cover of Toni Braxton's hit "Unbreak My Heart", translated into French as "Reste avec moi".

In 1999, Mathieu released another German album, Alles nur ein Spiel, featuring several modern songs with a techno sound, including "C'est ça l'amour" and "Wenn die Sehnsucht erwacht".

=== Career in the 21st century (2001–present) ===
In 2002, Mathieu released her thirty-seventh French album, De tes mains (EMI), followed by a series of concerts at the Paris Olympia in November and a tour in France, Belgium, and Switzerland. Reviews in the French press were quite positive, and the public gave Mathieu standing ovations every evening.

Mathieu celebrated the fortieth anniversary of her career at the Paris Olympia on 24 November 2005, releasing her thirty-eighth French album, Mireille Mathieu, produced by Patrick Hampartzoumian, who wrote the main title, "Une place dans mon cœur". The performance, along with an interview, was recorded and released in wide-screen DVD format in 2006; however, the DVD was available only in European video format.

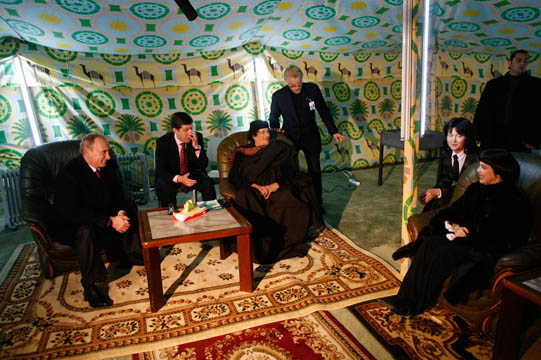
During a November 2008 visit to Russia, Gaddafi pitched his Bedouin tent on the grounds of the Kremlin. Here, he is joined by Russian Prime Minister Vladimir Putin and French singer Mireille Mathieu.

On 1 November 2008, she was a guest of Prime Minister Vladimir Putin in Moscow and performed a concert in his honor. The two visited the tent of visiting Libyan leader Muammar Gaddafi.

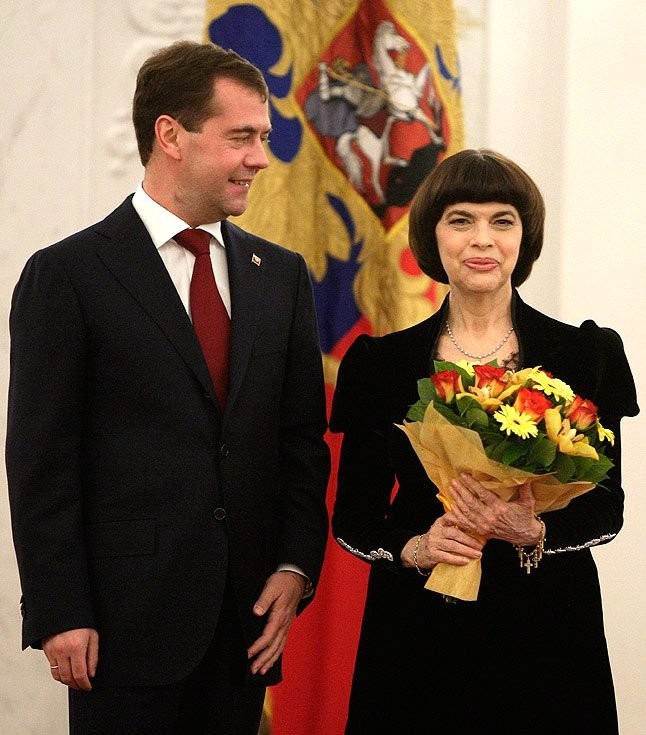
President Medvedev and Mireille Mathieu, November 2010

In November 2010, she was awarded the Russian Medal of Friendship by President Dmitry Medvedev at a state dinner. She was in Russia and the Baltic States throughout November, returning to Paris after a concert in Warsaw, Poland, on 28 November. In January 2011, Mireille was promoted from Chevalier (9 December 1999) to Officier of the Légion d'honneur.

In November 2011, Mathieu canceled her concert in Israel for the second time that year due to the promoter's failure to meet the required ticket sales.

In March 2012, Mathieu, along with Jean Claudric and his orchestra, visited three cities in Siberia, Russia: Perm (21 March), Tyumen (24 March), and Yekaterinburg (26 March).

During an interview in Moscow, Mathieu remarked that the group Pussy Riot had committed a sacrilege in the church by staging a political demonstration against President Putin. The French television program "On n'est pas couché" edited out the second half of her statement and labeled her a tool of President Putin. Her lawyer, André Schmidt, sued the station for defamation, but the suit was dismissed at trial in July 2014. The part that was edited out was "As a woman artist and a Christian, I beg the indulgence of these three girls." The three women were ultimately convicted and sentenced to two years in prison for hooliganism and inciting religious hatred.

In October 2012, Mathieu announced on her webpage that she would be re-releasing her album Chante Piaf, with two new recordings added in celebration of her 50th year as a singer and the 50th anniversary of Piaf's death. Also that month, she had to cancel several shows in Russia, including performances in Rostov, Volgograd, Samara, and Ufa. She had contracted these shows through a Yekaterinburg company called Mix Art, via her Malta agent, Foresa Investment Ltd. She stated that Mix Art "acted in a highly unprofessional and even fraudulent way". However, she was able to salvage the tours with performances in Moscow on 3 November 2012, Saint Petersburg on 5 November 2012, and Krasnodar on 7 November 2012. She also performed the rescheduled concert in Ufa on 7 March 2013.

In December 2013, her lawyers won a lawsuit against MGM Home Entertainment for failing to compensate her production company, Abilene Disc, for the 1967 song Les Yeux de l'amour (The Eyes of Love), which was used in the German version of the movie Casino Royale. Since 2009, she has been the main guest star of the Spasskaya Tower Military Music Festival and Tattoo, held on Moscow's Red Square. On 5 September 2013, during her concert at the festival, she performed in a light dress under icy rain and gusty winds, refusing an offer for a coat as she deemed it disrespectful to the freezing audience in the stands. Russian TV's Culture channel praised her performance that day as a remarkable feat.

Mathieu had an active tour schedule for 2014, celebrating her 50th year in show business (she dates her career from the year she won her first singing contest in Avignon). Her first concert was scheduled to be in Kyiv, and she held out hope it would proceed, but ultimately canceled it seven days prior "due to the instability". Her France 50th Anniversary tour ran from October to November 2014.

Mathieu performed her 50th Anniversary tour in Germany and Austria from 1 to 16 March 2015, singing at sold-out venues in twelve different cities. She credits her sister and manager, Monique, for keeping the general audience ticket prices reasonable.

In March 2015, she announced on her webpage that all concerts in Russia were canceled "due to the economic situation". The concert website stated that the Russian currency had collapsed, making it no longer possible to finance the concert and travel arrangements.

On 26 May 2015, Mathieu performed at the "Culture Without Borders" (Culture sans frontière) project at the UNESCO headquarters in Paris. She participated in a concert titled The Allies of the Great Victory: A Musical Story, featuring the Jazz Band of Igor Butman (Russia-US). Other soloists included Allan Harris (US), Sanya Kroitor (Israel), Yakov Yavno (US), Igor Butman, Mikhail Gluz (Russia), Polina Zizak (Russia), and various other celebrities.

On 30 July 2015, she returned to Byblos, Lebanon, after 41 years for the Byblos International Festival. Her sisters Monique—who is also her manager—and Marie France accompanied her mother on the trip, who then made a brief appearance with her on stage, escorted by the family servant, Hervé-Marc.

On 20 March 2016, Mathieu's mother died at the age of 94 from a pulmonary embolism. She was entombed in the mausoleum Mathieu at the Saint-Véran cemetery in Avignon.

== Personal life ==
Mathieu is a devout Catholic and attends Catholic Mass with her family.

== Bibliography ==
- Oui, je crois (Yes, I believe), with Jacqueline Cartier, Paris, Robert Laffont, 1987
- Моя судьба. История Любви (My Destiny. Love Story), Google Books, Translation by Jacob Zalmanovich, Moscow, Litres, 1991
