= André Pascal =

French musician (1932–2001)

André Pascal (15 April 1932 – 26 April 2001), born André Pascal Nicolas di Fusco in Marseille, was a French songwriter and composer.

== History ==
As an adolescent he was already well versed in French poetry from François Villon to Alfred de Vigny. He could express himself in Alexandrian couplets, and he started to write. A few years later he was adapting well known French songs for his friends in a restaurant trade who would play them on their premises. It was at this time in 1957 that he met Charles Aznavour who gave him the idea of trying to cut out a living in Paris. He co-wrote his first songs with Paul Mauriat. In 1958 Le Coq d'Or de la Chanson Française in Paris with Rendez-vous au Lavandou which was recorded by, among others, Dalida and Henri Salvador. In 1960 he entered the competition himself with Dans un million des années.

Following this he wrote many hits for the rockabillys and others: Laissez nous twister for les Chats Sauvages, Daniela (their biggest hit) for Les Chaussettes Noires, and Oh Mary Lou and Je for Danyel Gérard.

In 1964 he wrote the theme tune for the hit film Le Gendarme de Saint-Tropez, Dou-liou dou-liou St-Tropez which was a great success. Two years later he wrote 'Ticket de quai' for Annie Phillipe which shot to the top of the French charts.

Between 1967 and 1972 he wrote a lot of songs with Paul Mauriat for Mireille Mathieu: 'Mon Credo' (1,335,000 copies sold), Viens dans ma rue, La première étoile, La vieille barque, géant to name but a few.

In 1971 he re-joined forces with Paul Mauriat to write 'Soleil lèves toi' for Caterina Valente: this song denounced the dangers and perils of racism.

During his career he also wrote for Rika Zaraï, Michèle Torr, Romuald, John William, Nana Mouskouri, and Lucky Blondo

In 1969 he wrote Catherine for Romuald who sang it at the Eurovision Song Contest. In 1975 he won the Rose d'Or D'Antibes with Toi ma Princesse en blue jean, sung by William Sailly. He was artistic director and editor, Pierre Bellemare, producer, Gérard Gustin the composer.

In 1976 Nicoletta recorded his lyrics and arrangement of Glory Alleilua, a hit later covered by Celine Dion.

In 1979 Danyel Gérard recorded Marylou for which he was awarded a gold disc.

In 1981, after a long and successful career, tired with the demands of the showbiz world he returned to live in the South of France, where he continued to write. He died in 2001 following a long illness. His ashes were scattered in the sea close to Sète where he had spent his final years.
