= Michel Emer =

French musician, composer and lyricist (1906–1984)

Emer Rosenstein (June 19, 1906 – November 23, 1984), known professionally as Michel Emer, was a French musician, composer and lyricist. His songs have been performed by Édith Piaf, Fréhel, Damia, Lys Gauty, Yves Montand, Jean Sablon, André Claveau, Ray Ventura and his Collegians, Luis Mariano, Tino Rossi, and Eartha Kitt. He also wrote songs for at least one of his wife Jacqueline Maillan's shows.

The first of his songs to be sung by Édith Piaf was "L'Accordéoniste", which he composed in 1940. He went on to write more than twenty songs for her, including "J'm'en fous pas mal", "Bal dans ma rue", and "À quoi ça sert l'amour ?", one of her most famous songs, which she sang as a duet with her second husband Théo Sarapo.

He co-authored with Charles Trenet the music for the song "Y'a d'la joie", and arranged many of Trenet's songs. Jean Sablon performed and recorded his song "Béguin-Biguine" in 1932.

He was featured in the documentary "I Regret Nothing" about Edith Piaf.

== Personal life ==
In 1954 he married the actress Jacqueline Maillan. He is buried in the Cimetière de Bagneux in Paris.

== Compositions ==
=== Selected songs ===
- "L'Accordéoniste" (1940)
- "J'm'en fous pas mal"
- "Bal dans ma rue"
- "À quoi ça sert l'amour ?"

=== Operettas ===
- 1934: Loulou et ses boys- 3-act operette by Marc Cab, Paul Farge and Pierre Bayle. Music by Michel Emer and Georges Sellers (Théâtre Daunou, opening 7 December 1934)
- 1939: Billie et son équipe - operette by Michel Emer and Jean Sautreuil. Story by André Mouëzy-Éon and Albert Willemetz (Théâtre Mogador, opening 6 March 1939)

=== Recordings ===
- Hello, Baby, Mademoiselle / Dans les plaines du Far-West (Michel Emer et son orchestre - 78 rpm on Polydor
- Chanson aux nuages / Perfidia - 78 rpm on Polydor

=== Selected soundtracks ===
- 1934 : Les Suites d'un premier lit by Félix Gandéra
- 1939 : Le Paradis de Satan by Félix Gandéra
- 1947 : Counter Investigation by Jean Faurez
- 1951 : Les Maître-nageurs by Henri Lepage
- 1951 : Chacun son tour by André Berthomieu
- 1953 : Un acte d'amour by Anatole Litvak
- 1953 : Chasse au crime (TV series) - Episode "Police Headquarters"
- 1957 : Let's Be Daring, Madame by Robert Vernay
- 1957 : Fumée blonde by Robert Vernay and André Montoisy
- 1957 : Sylviane de mes nuits by Marcel Blistène
- 1958 : It's All Adam's Fault by Jacqueline Audry
- 1958 : The Stowaway (English version) by Ralph Habib and Lee Robinson
  - 1958: Le Passager clandestin (French version)
- 1958 : Premier mai by Luis Saslavsky
- 1958 : Mimi Pinson by Robert Darène
- 1958 : Madame et son auto by Robert Vernay
- 1959 : Houla-houla by Robert Darène
- 1968 : Puce (TV film) by Jacques Audoir
- 1973 : Joë petit boum-boum (animation film) by Jean Image
- 1979 : Féfé de Broadway (TV film) by Jeannette Hubert
