= List of Private Passions episodes (2015–2019) =

This is a list of Private Passions episodes from 2015 to 2019. It does not include repeated episodes or compilations.

== 2015 ==
| Date | Guest | Composer | Title | Performer |
|---|---|---|---|---|
| 4 Jan 2015 | Kate Gross | Traditional music | Sona | |
| 4 Jan 2015 | Kate Gross | Wolfgang Amadeus Mozart | The Magic Flute: Overture | |
| 4 Jan 2015 | Kate Gross | Leonard Bernstein | "Tonight" (from West Side Story) | |
| 4 Jan 2015 | Kate Gross | Antonín Dvořák | "Songs my Mother taught me (Gypsy Songs) | |
| 4 Jan 2015 | Kate Gross | Franz Schubert | Piano Sonata in B♭ major, D 960 (2nd movement: Andante) | |
| 4 Jan 2015 | Kate Gross | Hubert Parry | "Dear Lord and Father of Mankind" ("Repton") | |
| 18 Jan 2015 | Paul Cartledge | Gioachino Rossini | "Medaglie incomparabili" (Il viaggio a Reims) | |
| 18 Jan 2015 | Paul Cartledge | Schubert | String Quintet in C, D 956 (2nd movement: Adagio) | |
| 18 Jan 2015 | Paul Cartledge | Igor Stravinsky | Prologue (Apollo) | |
| 18 Jan 2015 | Paul Cartledge | Bob Dylan | "Masters of War" | |
| 18 Jan 2015 | Paul Cartledge | Johann Sebastian Bach | Courante (Cello Suite No. 4 in E♭ major, BWV 1010) | |
| 18 Jan 2015 | Paul Cartledge | Johannes Brahms | "Denn alles Fleisch, es ist wie Gras" (Ein Deutsches Requiem) | |
| 18 Jan 2015 | Paul Cartledge | Ancient Greek traditional music | 1st Delphic Hymn to Apollo | |
| 18 Jan 2015 | Paul Cartledge | Mozart | "Ruhe sanft" (Zaide) | |
| 25 Jan 2015 | Henrietta Bowden-Jones | Traditional music | "Roving Gambler" | |
| 25 Jan 2015 | Henrietta Bowden-Jones | Antonín Dvořák | "Song to the Moon" (Rusalka) | |
| 25 Jan 2015 | Henrietta Bowden-Jones | Mozart | "Donne mie la fate a tanti" (Così fan tutte) | |
| 25 Jan 2015 | Henrietta Bowden-Jones | Mozart | "Madamina, il catalogo è questo" (Don Giovanni) | |
| 25 Jan 2015 | Henrietta Bowden-Jones | Hubert Parry | "Jerusalem" | |
| 25 Jan 2015 | Henrietta Bowden-Jones | Henry Purcell | "Thy Hand Belinda... When I am laid in earth" (Dido and Aeneas) | |
| 25 Jan 2015 | Henrietta Bowden-Jones | Reynaldo Hahn | "La Barcheta" (No. 2 from Venezia) | |
| 8 Feb 2015 | Nicky Clayton | Olivier Messiaen | "Le Rousserolle effarvatte" (No. 7 from Catalogue d'oiseaux) | |
| 8 Feb 2015 | Nicky Clayton | Ottorino Respighi | "The Birth of Venus" (3rd movement from Trittico botticelliano [Botticelli Triptych]) | |
| 8 Feb 2015 | Nicky Clayton | Astor Piazzolla | "Milonga del Angel" | |
| 8 Feb 2015 | Nicky Clayton | Julian Anderson | Comedy of Change (section V) | |
| 8 Feb 2015 | Nicky Clayton | Leoš Janáček | "Death of Ostap" (2nd movement from Taras Bulba) | |
| 8 Feb 2015 | Nicky Clayton | Anton Bruckner | Symphony No. 9 in D minor (1st movement: Allegro) | |
| 8 Feb 2015 | Nicky Clayton | Maurice Ravel | "Le Gibet" (2nd movement from Gaspard de la nuit) | |
| 22 Feb 2015 | Ben Okri | George Frideric Handel | "Eternal Source of Light Divine" (from Ode for the Birthday of Queen Anne) | |
| 22 Feb 2015 | Ben Okri | Abdullah Ibrahim | "Mannenberg" | |
| 22 Feb 2015 | Ben Okri | Harper Simon | "Wishes and Stars" | |
| 22 Feb 2015 | Ben Okri | Mozart | "Laudate Dominum" (Vesperae solennes de confessore) | |
| 22 Feb 2015 | Ben Okri | Miles Davis | "Blue in Green" | |
| 22 Feb 2015 | Ben Okri | Ludwig van Beethoven | Symphony No. 6 ("Pastoral") (2nd movement: Andante, "By the Brook") | |
| 22 Feb 2015 | Ben Okri | Richard Wagner | Entry of the gods into Valhalla (Das Rheingold) | |
| 22 Feb 2015 | Ben Okri | Johann Pachelbel | Canon in G | |
| 8 Mar 2015 | Anna Meredith | Anna Meredith | "Connect it" | |
| 8 Mar 2015 | Anna Meredith | Richard Ayres | In the Alps (Scene 4: The Bobli Dance) | |
| 8 Mar 2015 | Anna Meredith | Owen Pallett | "I am not afraid" | |
| 8 Mar 2015 | Anna Meredith | Björk | "Unison" | |
| 8 Mar 2015 | Anna Meredith | Emily Hall | Sonnet (to words by Toby Litt) | |
| 8 Mar 2015 | Anna Meredith | Gustav Holst | Suite No. 2 in F (1st movement: March) | |
| 8 Mar 2015 | Anna Meredith | John Wilbye | "Draw on sweet night" | |
| 8 Mar 2015 | Anna Meredith | Jean Sibelius | Symphony No. 5 (3rd movement: Allegro molto) | |
| 15 Mar 2015 | Andy McNab | Giuseppe Verdi | "Sempre Libera" (La Traviata) | |
| 15 Mar 2015 | Andy McNab | Giacomo Puccini | "Nessun dorma" (Turandot) | |
| 15 Mar 2015 | Andy McNab | Genesis | "Los Endos" (A Trick of the Tail) | |
| 15 Mar 2015 | Andy McNab | Plainchant | "Crux fidelis" | |
| 15 Mar 2015 | Andy McNab | Clannad | "Theme from Harry's Game" | |
| 15 Mar 2015 | Andy McNab | Handel | "The People that walked in darkness...For unto us a child is born" (from Messiah) | |
| 15 Mar 2015 | Andy McNab | Wagner | Die Walküre (Ride of the Valkyries) | |
| 22 Mar 2015 | Robert Cohan | Sergei Prokofiev | Symphony No. 1 in D major, Op. 25 (Classical) (1st movement: Allegro) | |
| 22 Mar 2015 | Robert Cohan | Bach | Chaconne from Partita for Violin No. 2 in D minor | |
| 22 Mar 2015 | Robert Cohan | Eleanor Alberga | Lingua Franca | |
| 22 Mar 2015 | Robert Cohan | Jon Keliehor | Class | |
| 22 Mar 2015 | Robert Cohan | Antonio Vivaldi | Stabat Mater | |
| 22 Mar 2015 | Robert Cohan | Alan Hovhaness | Tzaikerk (Evening Song) | |
| 22 Mar 2015 | Robert Cohan | Edward Elgar | Sospiri | |
| 22 Mar 2015 | Robert Cohan | Barry Guy | Lysandra | |
| 5 Apr 2015 | Lucy Winkett | Sister Wynona Carr | "I Want to go to Heaven and Rest" | |
| 5 Apr 2015 | Lucy Winkett | Orlando Gibbons | "O Clap Your Hands" | |
| 5 Apr 2015 | Lucy Winkett | Messiaen | "Vocalise, pour l'ange qui annonce la fin du temps" (2nd movement from Quatuor pour le fin du temps) | |
| 5 Apr 2015 | Lucy Winkett | Bach | Sanctus (Mass in B minor) | |
| 5 Apr 2015 | Lucy Winkett | Traditional music | "Were you there when they crucified my Lord?" | |
| 5 Apr 2015 | Lucy Winkett | Sergei Rachmaninoff | Piano Concerto No. 2 in C minor (1st movement: Moderato) | |
| 5 Apr 2015 | Lucy Winkett | Richard Strauss | "Marie Theres'!.... Hab' mir's gelobt" (Der Rosenkavalier) | |
| 12 Apr 2015 | Jane Hawking | Brahms | Ein Deutsches Requiem, Op. 45 ("Wie lieblich sind deine Wohnungen") | |
| 12 Apr 2015 | Jane Hawking | Bach | Brandenburg Concerto No. 5 in D major | |
| 12 Apr 2015 | Jane Hawking | Tchaikovsky | Swan Lake (act 2: Overture) | |
| 12 Apr 2015 | Jane Hawking | Beethoven | Symphony No. 7 in A major (3rd movement: Presto) | |
| 12 Apr 2015 | Jane Hawking | Mozart | Clarinet Concerto in A major, K. 622 (1st movement: Allegro) | |
| 12 Apr 2015 | Jane Hawking | Schubert | Die Forelle (The Trout) | |
| 12 Apr 2015 | Jane Hawking | Frédéric Chopin | Piano Concerto No. 2 in F minor (2nd movement: Larghetto) | |
| 3 May 2015 | Tim Rice | Felix Mendelssohn | A Midsummer Night's Dream: Overture | |
| 3 May 2015 | Tim Rice | Frederick Loewe | "You Did It" (My Fair Lady) | |
| 3 May 2015 | Tim Rice | Malcolm Arnold | Peterloo | |
| 3 May 2015 | Tim Rice | Tim Rice | "That's My Story" | |
| 3 May 2015 | Tim Rice | Ralph Vaughan Williams | A London Symphony (3rd movement: Scherzo) | |
| 3 May 2015 | Tim Rice | Traditional English | "The Plough Boy" | |
| 3 May 2015 | Tim Rice | Jacques Offenbach | "Ah, que j'aime les militaires" (La Grande-Duchesse de Gerolstein) | |
| 3 May 2015 | Tim Rice | Jean Sibelius | The Swan of Tuonela | |
| 17 May 2015 | Iqbal Khan | Wagner | Der fliegende Hollander (Wie aus der Ferne) | |
| 17 May 2015 | Iqbal Khan | Verdi | "La Forza del Destino" (La Vergine degli angeli) | |
| 17 May 2015 | Iqbal Khan | Mozart | "Don Giovanni, a cenar teco" (Don Giovanni) | |
| 17 May 2015 | Iqbal Khan | Nitin Sawhney | The Conference | |
| 17 May 2015 | Iqbal Khan | Britten | War Requiem (Libera Me – Strange Meeting) | |
| 17 May 2015 | Iqbal Khan | Verdi | La Forza del Destino (act 2, finale) | |
| 17 May 2015 | Iqbal Khan | Jacques Ibert | Chanson de la mort de Don Quichotte | |
| 17 May 2015 | Iqbal Khan | Mahler | Symphony No. 2 (Resurrection) (5th movement, excerpt) | |
| 31 May 2015 | Alan Moses | Handel | "Oh Lord, Whose Mercies Numberless" (from Saul) | |
| 31 May 2015 | Alan Moses | Gaetano Donizetti | "Quando, rapito in estasi" (Lucia di Lammermoor) | |
| 31 May 2015 | Alan Moses | Harrison Birtwistle | "Dinah and Nick's Love Song" | |
| 31 May 2015 | Alan Moses | Beethoven | String Quartet in B♭ major, Op. 130 (5th movement: Cavatina) | |
| 31 May 2015 | Alan Moses | Georges Brassens | "Il n'y a pas d'amour heureux" | |
| 7 Jun 2015 | Christopher Le Brun | Wagner | "Good Friday Music" (Parsifal, act 3) | |
| 7 Jun 2015 | Christopher Le Brun | Francis Poulenc | "La Souris" | |
| 7 Jun 2015 | Christopher Le Brun | Francis Poulenc | "Fleurs" (Fiançailles pour rire) | |
| 7 Jun 2015 | Christopher Le Brun | Cole Porter | "Night and Day" | |
| 7 Jun 2015 | Christopher Le Brun | Arnold Schoenberg | Gurrelieder (Prelude) | |
| 7 Jun 2015 | Christopher Le Brun | William Walton | Viola Concerto (1st movement) | |
| 7 Jun 2015 | Christopher Le Brun | Edvard Grieg | "Nocturne" (Lyric Pieces, Op. 62, No. 4) | |
| 7 Jun 2015 | Christopher Le Brun | Debussy | Pelléas et Mélisande (act 1, scene 1) | |
| 14 Jun 2015 | Jung Chang | Richard Rodgers | "Blue Moon" | |
| 14 Jun 2015 | Jung Chang | 何占豪 | Butterfly Lovers' Concerto | |
| 14 Jun 2015 | Jung Chang | Traditional music | "Plum Blossom" | |
| 14 Jun 2015 | Jung Chang | Handel | Symphony; "Comfort ye, my people" (from Messiah) | |
| 14 Jun 2015 | Jung Chang | Traditional music | "Wild Geese on the Sandbank" | |
| 14 Jun 2015 | Jung Chang | Tomaso Giovanni Albinoni | "Adagio in G minor" | |
| 21 Jun 2015 | Alison Goldfrapp | Ennio Morricone | "Un altro mare" (Vergogna schifosi) | |
| 21 Jun 2015 | Alison Goldfrapp | Goldfrapp | "Utopia" (Felt Mountain) | |
| 21 Jun 2015 | Alison Goldfrapp | Traditional music | "Pilentzee Pee" | |
| 21 Jun 2015 | Alison Goldfrapp | Astor Piazzolla | "Balda para mi muerte" | |
| 21 Jun 2015 | Alison Goldfrapp | Mahler | Symphony No. 5 (4th movement: Adagietto) | |
| 21 Jun 2015 | Alison Goldfrapp | György Ligeti | Atmosphères | |
| 21 Jun 2015 | Alison Goldfrapp | Richard Strauss | "Frühling" (Four Last Songs) | |
| 21 Jun 2015 | Alison Goldfrapp | Steve Reich | "Pulses" (Music for 18 Musicians) | |
| 28 Jun 2015 | Rachel Nicholson | John Adams | Short Ride in a Fast Machine | |
| 28 Jun 2015 | Rachel Nicholson | Priaulx Rainier | Cycle for Declamation | |
| 28 Jun 2015 | Rachel Nicholson | Mozart | "Sull'aria ... che soave zeffiretto" (The Marriage of Figaro) | |
| 28 Jun 2015 | Rachel Nicholson | Handel | "Lascia ch'io pianga" (from Rinaldo) | |
| 28 Jun 2015 | Rachel Nicholson | Schubert | Des Müllers Blumen (Die schöne Müllerin) | |
| 28 Jun 2015 | Rachel Nicholson | Domenico Scarlatti | Sonata in F minor, Kk519 | |
| 28 Jun 2015 | Rachel Nicholson | Haydn | Trumpet Concerto in E♭ major (Finale: Allegro) | |
| 28 Jun 2015 | Rachel Nicholson | Bach | Mass in B minor, BWV 232 (Gloria) | |
| 12 Jul 2015 | Henry Marsh | Ali Farka Touré | "Soukora" | |
| 12 Jul 2015 | Henry Marsh | Domenico Scarlatti | Sonata in C♯ minor, Kk247 | |
| 12 Jul 2015 | Henry Marsh | Beethoven | String Quartet in B♭ major, Op. 130 (2nd movement: Presto) | |
| 12 Jul 2015 | Henry Marsh | Mozart | "Tamino mein! O welch ein Glück!" (The Magic Flute) | |
| 12 Jul 2015 | Henry Marsh | Bach | "So ist mein Jesus nun gefangen" (St Matthew Passion) | |
| 12 Jul 2015 | Henry Marsh | Sergei Prokofiev | Piano Concerto No. 1, Op. 10 (excerpt) | |
| 12 Jul 2015 | Henry Marsh | Béla Bartók | String Quartet No. 3 (Coda: Allegro Molto) | |
| 19 Jul 2015 | Mona Siddiqui | Liszt | Liebestraum No. 3 in A♭ | |
| 19 Jul 2015 | Mona Siddiqui | Mahler | Symphony No. 5 (4th movement: Adagietto) | |
| 19 Jul 2015 | Mona Siddiqui | Puccini | "Un bel di, vedremo" (Madam Butterfly) | |
| 19 Jul 2015 | Mona Siddiqui | Mehdi Hassan | "Rafta rafta voh meri hasti ka" | |
| 19 Jul 2015 | Mona Siddiqui | Tchaikovsky | Piano Concerto No. 1 (1st movement: Allegro) | |
| 19 Jul 2015 | Mona Siddiqui | John Williams | Remembrances (Schindler's List) | |
| 2 Aug 2015 | John Lahr | Mozart | Symphony No. 41 in C major (Jupiter) K. 551 (4th movement: Molto Allegro) | |
| 2 Aug 2015 | John Lahr | Jimmy Van Heusen | "Darn That Dream" | |
| 2 Aug 2015 | John Lahr | Noël Coward | "Why do the Wrong People Travel" | |
| 2 Aug 2015 | John Lahr | Schubert | Gute Nacht (Winterreise) | |
| 2 Aug 2015 | John Lahr | Charlie Foxx | "Mockingbird" | |
| 2 Aug 2015 | John Lahr | Leonard Bernstein | Candide: Overture | |
| 2 Aug 2015 | John Lahr | Jule Styne | "Catch our act at the Met" (Two on the Aisle) | |
| 9 Aug 2015 | Faramerz Dabhoiwala | Bach | Concerto in D minor for 2 violins, BWV 1043 (1st movement: Vivace) | |
| 9 Aug 2015 | Faramerz Dabhoiwala | Cristóbal de Morales | "Parce mihi Domine" | |
| 9 Aug 2015 | Faramerz Dabhoiwala | Nina Simone | "Mississippi Goddam" | |
| 9 Aug 2015 | Faramerz Dabhoiwala | Henry Purcell | "When I am Laid in Earth" (Dido and Aeneas) | |
| 9 Aug 2015 | Faramerz Dabhoiwala | Philip Glass | La Belle et La Bete: Ouverture | |
| 9 Aug 2015 | Faramerz Dabhoiwala | Bach | Cantata Wachet auf, ruft uns die Stimme, BWV 140: "Wachet auf" (opening chorus) | |
| 9 Aug 2015 | Faramerz Dabhoiwala | Schubert | Piano Sonata in A, D959 (2nd movement: Andantino) | |
| 30 Aug 2015 | Jancis Robinson | Traditional music | "A Frog He Would A-Wooing Go" | |
| 30 Aug 2015 | Jancis Robinson | Tchaikovsky | Eugene Onegin (Overture and opening) | |
| 30 Aug 2015 | Jancis Robinson | Mozart | Horn Concerto No. 1 in D major, K. 412 (1st movement: Allegro) | |
| 30 Aug 2015 | Jancis Robinson | Keith Jarrett | Solo Concert: Bremen, 12 July 1973 | |
| 30 Aug 2015 | Jancis Robinson | Mozart | "Finch'han dal vino" (Don Giovanni) | |
| 30 Aug 2015 | Jancis Robinson | Traditional music | "Cherry Tree Carol" | |
| 30 Aug 2015 | Jancis Robinson | Handel | "Con rauco mormorio" (from Rodelinda) | |
| 4 Oct 2015 | Athene Donald | Lili Boulanger | Psalm 130 (Du fond de l'abime) | |
| 4 Oct 2015 | Athene Donald | Leoš Janáček | String Quartet No. 2 "Intimate Letters" (2nd movement: Adagio) | |
| 4 Oct 2015 | Athene Donald | Thomas Tomkins | "When David Heard" | |
| 4 Oct 2015 | Athene Donald | Bach | Brandenburg Concerto No. 6 in B♭ major, BWV 1051 (1st movement) | |
| 4 Oct 2015 | Athene Donald | Brahms | "Denn alles Fleisch es ist wie Gras" (Ein Deutsches Requiem) | |
| 4 Oct 2015 | Athene Donald | Antonín Dvořák | Piano Quintet in A major, Op. 81 (3rd movement: Scherzo) | |
| 4 Oct 2015 | Athene Donald | Mozart | Sinfonia Concertante in E♭ major, K. 364 (1st movement: Allegro maestoso) | |

== 2016 ==
| Date | Guest | Composer | Title | Performer |
|---|---|---|---|---|
| 24 Jan 2016 | Baaba Maal | Fela Kuti | No Agreement | |
| 24 Jan 2016 | Baaba Maal | Baaba Maal | "Lam Toro" | |
| 24 Jan 2016 | Baaba Maal | Mozart | Piano Sonata in F major, K. 332 (3rd movement: Allegro assai) | |
| 24 Jan 2016 | Baaba Maal | Beethoven | Symphony No. 5 in C minor, Op. 67 (2nd movement: Andante) | |
| 24 Jan 2016 | Baaba Maal | Traditional Malian | "Epopee mandingue" (Soundjata Keita) | |
| 24 Jan 2016 | Baaba Maal | Mozart | Piano Concerto No. 23 in A major, K. 488 (2nd movement: Adagio) | |
| 24 Jan 2016 | Baaba Maal | Miles Davis | "So What" | |
| 31 Jan 2016 | Shirley Collins | William Boyce | Symphony No. 1 in D major | |
| 31 Jan 2016 | Shirley Collins | Traditional music | "Newcastle" | |
| 31 Jan 2016 | Shirley Collins | Traditional music | "A Denying" (The Blacksmith) | |
| 31 Jan 2016 | Shirley Collins | Handel | "Lascia ch'io pianga" (from Rinaldo) | |
| 31 Jan 2016 | Shirley Collins | Handel | "Silent Worship" (from Tolomeo) | |
| 31 Jan 2016 | Shirley Collins | Mississippi Fred McDowell | "61 Highway" | |
| 31 Jan 2016 | Shirley Collins | George Butterworth | "The Banks of Green Willow" | |
| 31 Jan 2016 | Shirley Collins | Michael Praetorius | "In Dulce Jubilo" (Lutheran Mass for Christmas Morning) | |
| 31 Jan 2016 | Shirley Collins | Traditional music | "Dear Father, Pray Build me a Boat" | |
| 7 Feb 2016 | Robert Harris | Manuel de Sumaya | Como aunque culpa | |
| 7 Feb 2016 | Robert Harris | John Barry | London 1946 (Enigma) | |
| 7 Feb 2016 | Robert Harris | Bach | "Mache dich mein Herze rein" (St Matthew Passion) | |
| 7 Feb 2016 | Robert Harris | Benny Goodman and His Orchestra | "Sing, Sing, Sing" | |
| 7 Feb 2016 | Robert Harris | Beethoven | Symphony No. 6 in F, Op. 68 (3rd movement: Allegro) | |
| 7 Feb 2016 | Robert Harris | Bach | Concerto in A minor for 4 keyboards, BWV 1065 (1st movement: Allegro) | |
| 7 Feb 2016 | Robert Harris | Amy Winehouse | Back to Black | |
| 21 Feb 2016 | Katharine Whitehorn | Pascal Bastia | "Je tire ma reverence" | |
| 21 Feb 2016 | Katharine Whitehorn | John Denver | Follow Me | |
| 21 Feb 2016 | Katharine Whitehorn | Mozart | Symphony No. 39 in E♭ major, K. 543 (2nd movement: Andante con moto) | |
| 21 Feb 2016 | Katharine Whitehorn | Bach | From Cantata No. 147: "Jesu, Joy of Man's Desiring" | |
| 21 Feb 2016 | Katharine Whitehorn | Chopin | Waltz in D♭, Op. 64, no. 1 ("Minute Waltz") | |
| 21 Feb 2016 | Katharine Whitehorn | Jean Sibelius | Finlandia | |
| 21 Feb 2016 | Katharine Whitehorn | Beethoven | Symphony No. 6 in F, Op. 68 ("Pastoral") (1st movement, excerpt) | |
| 6 Mar 2016 | Martha Lane Fox | Cole Porter | "Too Darn Hot" | |
| 6 Mar 2016 | Martha Lane Fox | Chopin | Nocturne in B major, Op. 9, No. 3 | |
| 6 Mar 2016 | Martha Lane Fox | Verdi | La Traviata (act 2, sc.1: Pura siccome un angelo) | |
| 6 Mar 2016 | Martha Lane Fox | Schubert | String Quintet in C (Adagio) | |
| 6 Mar 2016 | Martha Lane Fox | Scott Joplin | Elite Syncopations | |
| 6 Mar 2016 | Martha Lane Fox | Beethoven | Fidelio (Prisoners' Chorus: "O welche Lust") | |
| 6 Mar 2016 | Martha Lane Fox | Harold Arlen | Get Happy | |
| 27 Mar 2016 | Melanie Reid | Bach | Cello Suite No. 1 in G, BWV 1007 (Prelude) | |
| 27 Mar 2016 | Melanie Reid | Beethoven | Piano Concerto No. 5 in E♭, Op. 73 ("Emperor") (1st movement: Allegro) | |
| 27 Mar 2016 | Melanie Reid | Carl Nielsen | Violin Concerto, Op. 33 (2nd movement: Intermezzo: Poco adagio) | |
| 27 Mar 2016 | Melanie Reid | Van Morrison | "Cyprus Avenue" | |
| 27 Mar 2016 | Melanie Reid | Richard Strauss | Four Last Songs (No. 3: "Beim Schlafengehen") | |
| 27 Mar 2016 | Melanie Reid | Traditional music | "The Dark Island" | |
| 27 Mar 2016 | Melanie Reid | Holst | The Planets suite (4th movement: "Jupiter") | |
| 10 Apr 2016 | Melly Still | Leoš Janáček | The Cunning Little Vixen (final scene) | |
| 10 Apr 2016 | Melly Still | Mark d'Inverno | "So sweet of you" | |
| 10 Apr 2016 | Melly Still | Wagner | Tannhauser: Overture | |
| 10 Apr 2016 | Melly Still | Paul von Klenau | Die Weise von Liebe und Tod des Kornetts Christoph Rilke (excerpts) | |
| 10 Apr 2016 | Melly Still | Antonín Dvořák | Rusalka (act 2: "Rusalko, znáš mne, znáš?") | |
| 10 Apr 2016 | Melly Still | Monteverdi | L'Incoronazione di Poppea (act 3: Pur ti miro) | |
| 10 Apr 2016 | Melly Still | Terje Isungset | "A Glimpse of Light" | |
| 24 Apr 2016 | Jonathan Bate | Richard Strauss | "Wie erkenn' ich mein Treulieb" (Ophelia), Op. 67, No. 1 | |
| 24 Apr 2016 | Jonathan Bate | Taylor Swift | "Love Story" | |
| 24 Apr 2016 | Jonathan Bate | John Sheppard | Libera nos | |
| 24 Apr 2016 | Jonathan Bate | Thomas Linley | Overture: A Lyric Ode | |
| 24 Apr 2016 | Jonathan Bate | Mozart | "Soave sia il vento" (Così fan tutte) | |
| 24 Apr 2016 | Jonathan Bate | Berlioz | Fantaisie sur la Tempete de Shakespeare (Lelio) | |
| 24 Apr 2016 | Jonathan Bate | Wagner | "Das Liebesverbot" (So spat und noch kein Brief von Isabella...) | |
| 1 May 2016 | Roger Allam | Messiaen | "La Vierge et l'enfant" (1st movement from La Nativité du Seigneur) | |
| 1 May 2016 | Roger Allam | Ravel | "Asie" (1st part of Shéhérazade) | |
| 1 May 2016 | Roger Allam | Britten | Nocturne (Serenade for Tenor, Horn and Strings) | |
| 1 May 2016 | Roger Allam | Anonymous work | Estampie Royal No. 6 | |
| 1 May 2016 | Roger Allam | Bach | Goldberg Variations, BWV 988: Variation No. 14 | |
| 1 May 2016 | Roger Allam | Mahler | Symphony No. 4 (4th movement) | |
| 1 May 2016 | Roger Allam | Schubert | "Das Wirthaus" (No. 21 from Winterreise) | |
| 1 May 2016 | Roger Allam | Claude-Michel Schönberg | "Stars" (Les Misérables) | |
| 15 May 2016 | Rose Tremain | Mahler | Symphony No. 5 (4th movement: Adagietto) | |
| 15 May 2016 | Rose Tremain | George Gershwin | Rhapsody in Blue | |
| 15 May 2016 | Rose Tremain | John Dowland | "Lachrimae Antiquae" | |
| 15 May 2016 | Rose Tremain | Jacques Plante | La Bohème | |
| 15 May 2016 | Rose Tremain | Beethoven | Sonata in E♭ major, Op. 81a ("Les Adieux") (2nd movement: L'Absence) | |
| 15 May 2016 | Rose Tremain | Boudleaux Bryant | "Bye Bye Love" | |
| 15 May 2016 | Rose Tremain | Schubert | "Der Lindenbaum" (Winterreise) | |
| 22 May 2016 | Jane Goodall | Felix Mendelssohn | Violin Concerto in E minor (2nd movement: Andante) | |
| 22 May 2016 | Jane Goodall | Hukwe Zawose | Lukunzi | |
| 22 May 2016 | Jane Goodall | Beethoven | Piano Sonata in C♯ minor, Op. 27, no. 2 ("Moonlight") (1st movement: Adagio Sostenuto) | |
| 22 May 2016 | Jane Goodall | Schubert | Salve Regina in B♭, D. 386 | |
| 22 May 2016 | Jane Goodall | Bach | Toccata and Fugue in D minor, BWV. 565 | |
| 22 May 2016 | Jane Goodall | Antonín Dvořák | Cello Concerto in B minor, Op. 104 (1st movement: Allegro) | |
| 5 Jun 2016 | Tanita Tikaram | Duke Ellington | "Creole Love Call" | |
| 5 Jun 2016 | Tanita Tikaram | Lalo Schifrin | "The Blues for Johann Sebastian Bach" | |
| 5 Jun 2016 | Tanita Tikaram | Vivaldi | "Ch'infelice sempre" (from the cantata Cessate, omai cessate) | |
| 5 Jun 2016 | Tanita Tikaram | Ravel | Piano Concerto in G (2nd movement: Adagio assai) | |
| 5 Jun 2016 | Tanita Tikaram | Joseph Canteloube | "Baïlèro" (from Chants d'Auvergne) | |
| 5 Jun 2016 | Tanita Tikaram | Bach | Partita No. 2 in C minor, BWV 1004 | |
| 5 Jun 2016 | Tanita Tikaram | Tanita Tikaram | "Twist in My Sobriety" | |
| 5 Jun 2016 | Tanita Tikaram | Bach | Partita for keyboard No. 2 in C minor, BWV 826 (1st movement: Sinfonia) | |
| 5 Jun 2016 | Tanita Tikaram | Mozart | Piano Concerto No. 23 in A major, K. 488 (2nd movement: Andante) | |
| 12 Jun 2016 | John Sutherland | Richard Strauss | Also sprach Zarathustra (excerpt) | |
| 12 Jun 2016 | John Sutherland | Beethoven | Piano Concerto No. 2 in B♭ major (2nd movement: Adagio) | |
| 12 Jun 2016 | John Sutherland | Traditional music | "The Lass of Aughrim" | |
| 12 Jun 2016 | John Sutherland | Edward Harper | Fanny Robin (Epilogue) | |
| 12 Jun 2016 | John Sutherland | Britten | Peter Grimes (act 3: "Grimes!") | |
| 12 Jun 2016 | John Sutherland | Ralph Vaughan Williams | Sinfonia Antartica (Opening) | |
| 12 Jun 2016 | John Sutherland | Camille Saint-Saëns | "The Swan" (The Carnival of the Animals) | |
| 19 Jun 2016 | Andrew Solomon | Britten | "Tell me the Truth about Love" (Cabaret Songs) | |
| 19 Jun 2016 | Andrew Solomon | Mozart | "Dove sono" (The Marriage of Figaro) | |
| 19 Jun 2016 | Andrew Solomon | Richard Strauss | "Marie Theres'! ... Hab mir's gelobt" (Der Rosenkavalier) | |
| 19 Jun 2016 | Andrew Solomon | Ralph Vaughan Williams | Youth and Love (Songs of Travel) | |
| 19 Jun 2016 | Andrew Solomon | Rachmaninoff | Piano Concerto No. 3 in D minor, Op. 30 (2nd movement: Intermezzo) | |
| 19 Jun 2016 | Andrew Solomon | Richard Strauss | "Zueignung" | |
| 19 Jun 2016 | Andrew Solomon | Reynaldo Hahn | "A Chloris" | |
| 19 Jun 2016 | Andrew Solomon | Žibuoklė Martinaitytė | Completely Embraced by the Beauty of Emptiness | |
| 26 Jun 2016 | Glenda Jackson | Ralph Vaughan Williams | A London Symphony (1st movement: Lento) | |
| 26 Jun 2016 | Glenda Jackson | Shostakovich | Symphony No. 5 in D minor, Op. 47 (1st movement: Moderato) | |
| 26 Jun 2016 | Glenda Jackson | John Adams | The Chairman Dances | |
| 26 Jun 2016 | Glenda Jackson | Stevie Wonder | "You Haven't Done Nothing" | |
| 26 Jun 2016 | Glenda Jackson | Steve Reich | Clapping Music | |
| 26 Jun 2016 | Glenda Jackson | Cole Porter | "Love for Sale" | |
| 26 Jun 2016 | Glenda Jackson | Stravinsky | Symphony of Psalms (3rd movement: Alleluja) | |
| 24 Jul 2016 | Timberlake Wertenbaker | Mikel Laboa | "Txoria txori" | |
| 24 Jul 2016 | Timberlake Wertenbaker | Nina Simone | "Four Women" | |
| 24 Jul 2016 | Timberlake Wertenbaker | Schubert | Notturno, D. 897 | |
| 24 Jul 2016 | Timberlake Wertenbaker | Mikis Theodorakis | The Ballad of Mauthausen | |
| 24 Jul 2016 | Timberlake Wertenbaker | Ravel | Piano Trio in A minor (1st movement: Modéré) | |
| 24 Jul 2016 | Timberlake Wertenbaker | Naseer Shamma | "The Love of Birds" | |
| 24 Jul 2016 | Timberlake Wertenbaker | Beethoven | "O Welche Lust!" (Fidelio, act 1) | |
| 7 Aug 2016 | Janine di Giovanni | Engelbert Humperdinck | Abendsegen (Hansel und Gretel) | |
| 7 Aug 2016 | Janine di Giovanni | Bach | "Aria" (Goldberg Variations) | |
| 7 Aug 2016 | Janine di Giovanni | Mozart | Clarinet Concerto in A major, K. 622 (2nd movement: Adagio) | |
| 7 Aug 2016 | Janine di Giovanni | Schubert | Piano Trio in E♭ major (1st movement: Allegro) | |
| 7 Aug 2016 | Janine di Giovanni | James Taylor | "You Can Close Your Eyes" | |
| 7 Aug 2016 | Janine di Giovanni | Chopin | Nocturne in C minor, Op. 48, No. 1 | |
| 7 Aug 2016 | Janine di Giovanni | Jimi Hendrix | "Little Wing" | |
| 14 Aug 2016 | Stephen Hugh-Jones | Beethoven | String Quartet in A minor, Op. 132 (2nd movement: Allegro ma non tanto) | |
| 14 Aug 2016 | Stephen Hugh-Jones | Henry Purcell | "Come ye Sons of Art" | |
| 14 Aug 2016 | Stephen Hugh-Jones | Schubert | Piano Sonata in A, D.959 (4th movement: Rondo) | |
| 14 Aug 2016 | Stephen Hugh-Jones | Bach | "Schlummert ein" (Cantata Ich habe genug, BWV 82) | |
| 14 Aug 2016 | Stephen Hugh-Jones | Rudy Gomis | Coumbra | |
| 14 Aug 2016 | Stephen Hugh-Jones | Rafael Escalona | El arco iris | |
| 21 Aug 2016 | Anna Pavord | Schubert | Impromptu in G♭ major, D. 899, no. 3 | |
| 21 Aug 2016 | Anna Pavord | Elgar | Cello Concerto in E minor, Op. 85 (1st movement: Adagio – Moderato) | |
| 21 Aug 2016 | Anna Pavord | Arwel Hughes | Cwm Rhondda | |
| 21 Aug 2016 | Anna Pavord | Schubert | String Quintet in C major, D.956 (2nd movement: Adagio) | |
| 21 Aug 2016 | Anna Pavord | Bach | "Weichet nur, betrübte Schatten" (Cantata Weichet nur, betrübte Schatten, BWV 202) | |
| 21 Aug 2016 | Anna Pavord | Cleo Gibson | "I've got Ford engine movements in my hips" | |
| 28 Aug 2016 | Steve Silberman | John Abercrombie | Timeless | |
| 28 Aug 2016 | Steve Silberman | Steve Reich | Music for 18 Musicians (final sections) | |
| 28 Aug 2016 | Steve Silberman | Lou Harrison | Avalokiteshvara | |
| 28 Aug 2016 | Steve Silberman | Pérotin | "Viderunt Omnes" | |
| 28 Aug 2016 | Steve Silberman | Allen Ginsberg | "The End" | |
| 28 Aug 2016 | Steve Silberman | Bill Evans | "Peace Piece" | |
| 28 Aug 2016 | Steve Silberman | Steve Reich | Daniel Variations (No. 2: My name is Daniel Pearl) | |
| 11 Sep 2016 | Daniel Libeskind | Pérotin | Sederunt principes | |
| 11 Sep 2016 | Daniel Libeskind | Traditional music | "Amazing Grace" | |
| 11 Sep 2016 | Daniel Libeskind | Leonard Bernstein | Symphony No. 2 (The Age of Anxiety) (excerpt) | |
| 11 Sep 2016 | Daniel Libeskind | Bach | Cantata Komm, du süsse Todesstunde, BWV 161 (Aria: "Mein Verlangen") | |
| 11 Sep 2016 | Daniel Libeskind | Claus-Steffen Mahnkopf | Deconstructing Accordion | |
| 11 Sep 2016 | Daniel Libeskind | Kaija Saariaho | ... A la Fumee | |
| 11 Sep 2016 | Daniel Libeskind | Beethoven | Symphony No. 9 in D minor, Op. 125 (Choral (Finale, excerpt) | |
| 18 Sep 2016 | George Shaw | Gluck | What Is Life? | |
| 18 Sep 2016 | George Shaw | Henry Purcell | "Cold Song" | |
| 18 Sep 2016 | George Shaw | Brian Eno | "Patrolling Wire Borders" | |
| 18 Sep 2016 | George Shaw | Brian Eno | M386 | |
| 18 Sep 2016 | George Shaw | Traditional music | "Lord of the Dance" | |
| 18 Sep 2016 | George Shaw | Elgar | Cello Concerto – III Adagio | |
| 18 Sep 2016 | George Shaw | Joy Division | "Heart and Soul" | |
| 18 Sep 2016 | George Shaw | Schubert | Der Leiermann | |
| 25 Sep 2016 | Dame Joan Plowright | Stravinsky | The Rite of Spring (excerpt) | |
| 25 Sep 2016 | Dame Joan Plowright | Anton Karas | Harry Lime Theme | |
| 25 Sep 2016 | Dame Joan Plowright | William Walton | Cello Concerto (1st movement: Moderato) | |
| 25 Sep 2016 | Dame Joan Plowright | William Walton | This Day is Called the Feast of St Crispian (Henry V) | |
| 25 Sep 2016 | Dame Joan Plowright | Johann Pachelbel | Canon in D | |
| 25 Sep 2016 | Dame Joan Plowright | Puccini | Vissi darte (Tosca) | |
| 2 Oct 2016 | Grayson Perry | Tchaikovsky | Violin Concerto in D, Op. 35 (1st movement: Allegro moderato) | |
| 2 Oct 2016 | Grayson Perry | Handel | "Ombra mai fu" (from Xerxes) | |
| 2 Oct 2016 | Grayson Perry | Philip Glass | Metamorphosis 2 | |
| 2 Oct 2016 | Grayson Perry | Frank Turner | Love, Ire and Song | |
| 2 Oct 2016 | Grayson Perry | Alessandro Marcello | Oboe concerto in D minor (2nd movement: Adagio) | |
| 2 Oct 2016 | Grayson Perry | John Hartford | Gentle on my Mind | |
| 9 Oct 2016 | Lara Feigel | Bach | English Suite No. 2 in A minor, BWV 807 (Prelude) | |
| 9 Oct 2016 | Lara Feigel | Beethoven | Symphony No. 7 in A major, Op. 92 (2nd movement: Larghetto) | |
| 9 Oct 2016 | Lara Feigel | Wagner | O sink hernieder (Tristan und Isolde) | |
| 9 Oct 2016 | Lara Feigel | Friedrich Hollaender | Illusions | |
| 9 Oct 2016 | Lara Feigel | Debussy | Violin Sonata (1st movement: Allegro moderato) | |
| 9 Oct 2016 | Lara Feigel | Richard Strauss | "Morgen!", Op. 24, No. 7 | |
| 9 Oct 2016 | Lara Feigel | Bach | Brandenburg Concerto No. 1 in F, BWV 1046 (2nd movement: Adagio) | |
| 16 Oct 2016 | Paterson Joseph | Tchaikovsky | Eugene Onegin (Final scene) | |
| 16 Oct 2016 | Paterson Joseph | Louis Armstrong | "Memphis Blues Medley" | |
| 16 Oct 2016 | Paterson Joseph | Ignatius Sancho | selection | |
| 16 Oct 2016 | Paterson Joseph | Richard Rodgers | "Glad to be Unhappy" | |
| 16 Oct 2016 | Paterson Joseph | Charles Mingus | "Better Git It in Your Soul" | |
| 16 Oct 2016 | Paterson Joseph | Bernie Leadon | The Hitchhikers Guide to the Galaxy – theme tune | |
| 16 Oct 2016 | Paterson Joseph | Bach | "Wo zwei und drei versammlet sind" (Cantata Am Abend aber desselbigen Sabbats, BWV 42) | |
| 23 Oct 2016 | Helen Oyeyemi | Nikolai Rimsky-Korsakov | Oriental Dance (Scheherazade) | |
| 23 Oct 2016 | Helen Oyeyemi | Mohammed Rafi | Suhan Raat Dhal Chooki | |
| 23 Oct 2016 | Helen Oyeyemi | Bohuslav Martinů | Pierrots Serenade & The New Puppet (Loutky [Puppets]) | |
| 23 Oct 2016 | Helen Oyeyemi | Jacques Offenbach | "Les oiseaux dans la charmille" (Les Contes d'Hoffmann) | |
| 23 Oct 2016 | Helen Oyeyemi | Cherry Filter | "Flying Duck" | |
| 23 Oct 2016 | Helen Oyeyemi | Bob Crewe | Silhouettes | |
| 6 Nov 2016 | Thérèse Oulton | Britten | Elegy (Serenade for tenor, horn and strings) | |
| 6 Nov 2016 | Thérèse Oulton | Shostakovich | Prelude and fugue in A major, Op. 87, No. 7 | |
| 6 Nov 2016 | Thérèse Oulton | Mary Lou Williams | "Back to the blues" | |
| 6 Nov 2016 | Thérèse Oulton | Wagner | Prelude: Das Rheingold | |
| 6 Nov 2016 | Thérèse Oulton | Kurt Weill | "Mack the Knife" | |
| 6 Nov 2016 | Thérèse Oulton | Messiaen | "Les Ressuscités et le chant de l'étoile Aldebaran" (from Des Canyons aux étoiles...) | |
| 6 Nov 2016 | Thérèse Oulton | John Cage | Sonatas XIV and XV (Gemini) | |
| 6 Nov 2016 | Thérèse Oulton | Laura Cannell | "All the Land Ablaze" | |
| 13 Nov 2016 | Geoff Dyer | Bach | Prelude and Fugue in C major, BWV 846 (The Well-Tempered Clavier, Book 1) | |
| 13 Nov 2016 | Geoff Dyer | Miles Davis | "He Loved Him Madly" (Panthallasa) | |
| 13 Nov 2016 | Geoff Dyer | R. A. Ramamani | Kartik | |
| 13 Nov 2016 | Geoff Dyer | Traditional Indian | "Raga kirvani" | |
| 13 Nov 2016 | Geoff Dyer | Bob Dylan | "I'm Not There" | |
| 13 Nov 2016 | Geoff Dyer | Beethoven | String Quartet in A minor, Op. 132 (3rd movement: Molto Adagio) | |
| 13 Nov 2016 | Geoff Dyer | The Necks | Drive By | |
| 20 Nov 2016 | Charlie Phillips | Traditional music | "Go Down Moses" | |
| 20 Nov 2016 | Charlie Phillips | Verdi | "La Donna e mobile" (Rigoletto) | |
| 20 Nov 2016 | Charlie Phillips | Puccini | "Recondita Armonia" (Tosca) | |
| 20 Nov 2016 | Charlie Phillips | Verdi | "Va Pensiero" (Nabucco) | |
| 20 Nov 2016 | Charlie Phillips | Scott Joplin | Treemonisha (Overture and act 3 aria) | |
| 20 Nov 2016 | Charlie Phillips | Dave Brubeck | "Blue Rondo a la Turk" | |
| 20 Nov 2016 | Charlie Phillips | Traditional music | "How Great Thou Art" | |
| 4 Dec 2016 | Chris Hadfield | David Bowie | "Space Oddity" | |
| 4 Dec 2016 | Chris Hadfield | Holst | "Jupiter – the Bringer of Jollity" (from The Planets) | |
| 4 Dec 2016 | Chris Hadfield | Rossini | William Tell Overture | |
| 4 Dec 2016 | Chris Hadfield | Hans Zimmer | The Battle (Gladiator) | |
| 4 Dec 2016 | Chris Hadfield | William Herschel | Symphony No. 8 in C minor | |
| 4 Dec 2016 | Chris Hadfield | Stan Rogers | Northwest Passage | |
| 4 Dec 2016 | Chris Hadfield | Johann Strauss II | "On the Beautiful Blue Danube" | |
| 18 Dec 2016 | Edward Watson | Liszt | Harmonies du Soir (Etudes dexecution transcendentale) | |
| 18 Dec 2016 | Edward Watson | Luiz Florez | "Volver, volver" | |
| 18 Dec 2016 | Edward Watson | Max Richter | Infra 8 | |
| 18 Dec 2016 | Edward Watson | Martha Wainwright | "Don't Forget" | |
| 18 Dec 2016 | Edward Watson | Arnold Schoenberg | Verklärte Nacht | |
| 18 Dec 2016 | Edward Watson | Bev Lee Harling | "Barefoot in your Kitchen" | |
| 18 Dec 2016 | Edward Watson | Tchaikovsky | The Nutcracker (act 1, tableau 1: Night) | |
| 25 Dec 2016 | Archbishop John Sentamu | Handel | "For Unto Us a Child is Born" (Messiah) | |
| 25 Dec 2016 | Archbishop John Sentamu | James Montgomery | "Ekisera Kye Kitsu" | |
| 25 Dec 2016 | Archbishop John Sentamu | Elgar | Cello Concerto in E minor, Op. 85 (1st movement: Adagio) | |
| 25 Dec 2016 | Archbishop John Sentamu | Francis Routh | A Sacred Tetralogy (1: The Manger Throne – Christmas) | |
| 25 Dec 2016 | Archbishop John Sentamu | Maggi Dawn | "Come Lord Jesus, Come" | |
| 25 Dec 2016 | Archbishop John Sentamu | Felix Mendelssohn | "Hark, the Herald Angels Sing" | |
| 25 Dec 2016 | Archbishop John Sentamu | Ralph Vaughan Williams | Fantasia on Christmas Carols | |

== 2017 ==
| Date | Guest | Composer | Title | Performer |
|---|---|---|---|---|
| 15 Jan 2017 | Philippe Sands | Leonard Cohen | Anthem | |
| 15 Jan 2017 | Philippe Sands | Bach | "Erbarme dich" (St Matthew Passion) | |
| 15 Jan 2017 | Philippe Sands | Rachmaninoff | Melodiya, Op. 21, No. 9 | |
| 15 Jan 2017 | Philippe Sands | Keith Jarrett | Koln Concert (part 1) | |
| 15 Jan 2017 | Philippe Sands | Seckou Keita | Les Bras de Mer | |
| 15 Jan 2017 | Philippe Sands | Mahler | Symphony No. 9 (1st movement, extract) | |
| 15 Jan 2017 | Philippe Sands | Stephin Merritt | "Let's Pretend We're Bunny Rabbits" | |
| 29 Jan 2017 | Stephanie Flanders | Donald Swann | Ill Wind/Friendly Duet | |
| 29 Jan 2017 | Stephanie Flanders | Mozart | Trio in E♭ major, K. 498 ("Kegelstatt") (1st movement: Andante) | |
| 29 Jan 2017 | Stephanie Flanders | Haydn | Piano Sonata in C major (H.16:50) (1st movement) | |
| 29 Jan 2017 | Stephanie Flanders | Joseph Horovitz | "Foie Gras" | |
| 29 Jan 2017 | Stephanie Flanders | Aaron Copland | Appalachian Spring (opening) | |
| 29 Jan 2017 | Stephanie Flanders | Ariel Ramírez | Misa Criolla (Gloria) | |
| 29 Jan 2017 | Stephanie Flanders | Donald Swann | Bilbo's Last Song | |
| 5 Feb 2017 | Sarah Lucas | Britten | Fanfare for St Edmondsbury | |
| 5 Feb 2017 | Sarah Lucas | Jon Anderson | "Long Distance Runaround" | |
| 5 Feb 2017 | Sarah Lucas | Traditional music | "Sally in our Alley" | |
| 5 Feb 2017 | Sarah Lucas | Ivor Gurney | "Sleep" | |
| 5 Feb 2017 | Sarah Lucas | Henry Purcell | King Arthur (act 1, excerpt) | |
| 5 Feb 2017 | Sarah Lucas | Can | "Oh Yeah" | |
| 5 Feb 2017 | Sarah Lucas | Julian Simmons | "The Slider" | |
| 5 Feb 2017 | Sarah Lucas | Britten | "The Big Chariot" (Songs from the Chinese) | |
| 5 Feb 2017 | Sarah Lucas | Britten | "Dance Song" (Songs from the Chinese) | |
| 12 Feb 2017 | Peter Robinson | Francis Poulenc | Sextet for Piano and Wind (1st movement: Allegro vivace) | |
| 12 Feb 2017 | Peter Robinson | Beethoven | String Quartet in C♯ minor, Op. 131 (7th movement: Allegro) | |
| 12 Feb 2017 | Peter Robinson | Sandy Denny | "Who Knows Where the Time Goes?" | |
| 12 Feb 2017 | Peter Robinson | Schubert | Piano Sonata in B♭ major, D960 (1st movement: Allegro) | |
| 12 Feb 2017 | Peter Robinson | Joaquín Rodrigo | Concierto de Aranjuez | |
| 12 Feb 2017 | Peter Robinson | Toru Takemitsu | "Spirit Garden" | |
| 12 Feb 2017 | Peter Robinson | Jimi Hendrix | "Purple Haze" | |
| 19 Feb 2017 | Petina Gappah | Verdi | Aida (act 2 Finale: Triumphal March) | |
| 19 Feb 2017 | Petina Gappah | Thomas Mapfumo | "Shumba" | |
| 19 Feb 2017 | Petina Gappah | Verdi | Nabucco (Chorus of the Hebrew Slaves) | |
| 19 Feb 2017 | Petina Gappah | Mahler | Piano Quartet in A minor | |
| 19 Feb 2017 | Petina Gappah | Tchaikovsky | The Nutcracker (act 2, Pas de deux) | |
| 19 Feb 2017 | Petina Gappah | Bob Dylan | "Every Grain of Sand" | |
| 19 Feb 2017 | Petina Gappah | Bhundu Boys | "Foolish Harp" | |
| 5 Mar 2017 | Vesna Goldsworthy | Iosif Ivanovici | The Danube Waves | |
| 5 Mar 2017 | Vesna Goldsworthy | St Nectarios of Aegina | "Agni partene" (O virgin pure) | |
| 5 Mar 2017 | Vesna Goldsworthy | Manuel Valls | Adio querida | |
| 5 Mar 2017 | Vesna Goldsworthy | Никита Богословский | "Dark is the night" | |
| 5 Mar 2017 | Vesna Goldsworthy | Tchaikovsky | Marche slave | |
| 5 Mar 2017 | Vesna Goldsworthy | Henry Purcell | "When I am laid in earth" (Dido and Aeneas) | |
| 12 Mar 2017 | Frances Barber | Shane Cullinan | "Throw him a Line" (The Pieta) | |
| 12 Mar 2017 | Frances Barber | Kurt Weill | "Surabaya Johnny" | |
| 12 Mar 2017 | Frances Barber | Chopin | Piano Concerto No. 2 in F minor, Op. 21 (2nd movement: Larghetto) | |
| 12 Mar 2017 | Frances Barber | Michael Nyman | Time Lapse | |
| 12 Mar 2017 | Frances Barber | Alfredo Catalani | "Ebben? Ne andro lontana" (La Wally) | |
| 12 Mar 2017 | Frances Barber | Pet Shop Boys | "Left to My Own Devices" | |
| 12 Mar 2017 | Frances Barber | Schubert | String Quintet in C major, D.956 (2nd movement: Adagio) | |
| 19 Mar 2017 | Juliet Nicolson | Handel | Zadok the Priest | |
| 19 Mar 2017 | Juliet Nicolson | George Gershwin | "Rhapsody in Blue" | |
| 19 Mar 2017 | Juliet Nicolson | Bach | Brandenburg Concerto No. 1, BWV 1046 (1st movement: Allegro) | |
| 19 Mar 2017 | Juliet Nicolson | Beethoven | Piano Concerto No. 5 in E♭ major (1st movement: Allegro) | |
| 19 Mar 2017 | Juliet Nicolson | Dory Previn | "Mythical Kings and Iguanas" | |
| 19 Mar 2017 | Juliet Nicolson | Handel | Water Music – Suite No. 1 (excerpt) | |
| 19 Mar 2017 | Juliet Nicolson | Mike Deighan | "Champs Elysees" | |
| 2 Apr 2017 | Thomas Ostermeier | Shostakovich | String Quartet No. 15, Op. 144 (1st movement: Elegy: Adagio) | |
| 2 Apr 2017 | Thomas Ostermeier | Béla Bartók | Piano Concerto No. 1 (1st movement: Allegro moderato) | |
| 2 Apr 2017 | Thomas Ostermeier | The Stooges | "I Wanna Be Your Dog" | |
| 2 Apr 2017 | Thomas Ostermeier | Heinrich Ignaz Franz Biber von Bibern | Rosary Sonata no. 16 in G minor (Passacaglia) | |
| 2 Apr 2017 | Thomas Ostermeier | John Cage | 6 Melodies (No. 1: Rubato) | |
| 2 Apr 2017 | Thomas Ostermeier | Luciano Berio | Sequenza VIII | |
| 2 Apr 2017 | Thomas Ostermeier | John Adams | Road Movies (no. 1: Relaxed Groove) | |
| 16 Apr 2017 | Mark Padmore | Bach | "Ach Herr, lass dein lieb Engelein" (St John Passion, BWV 245) | |
| 16 Apr 2017 | Mark Padmore | Jacob Handl | Ecce quomodo moritur justus | |
| 16 Apr 2017 | Mark Padmore | John Cage | Experiences No. 2 | |
| 16 Apr 2017 | Mark Padmore | Mahler | "Ich bin der Welt abhanden gekommen" | |
| 16 Apr 2017 | Mark Padmore | Nebojša Jovan Živković | Trio per uno, Op. 27, III | |
| 16 Apr 2017 | Mark Padmore | Ryan Wigglesworth | Augenlieder IV: Keep your eyes open | |
| 16 Apr 2017 | Mark Padmore | Schubert | Der Winterabend | |
| 16 Apr 2017 | Mark Padmore | Thomas A. Dorsey | "Take my hand, precious Lord" | |
| 23 Apr 2017 | A. L. Kennedy | Francesco Cavalli | Piacque a me sempre piu (LEgisto) | |
| 23 Apr 2017 | A. L. Kennedy | Francesco Cavalli | "Lasso io vivo e non ho vita"(LEgisto) | |
| 23 Apr 2017 | A. L. Kennedy | Osvaldo Golijov | Tekyah | |
| 23 Apr 2017 | A. L. Kennedy | Josquin des Prez | "Mille regretz" | |
| 23 Apr 2017 | A. L. Kennedy | Guy Woolfenden | "Full Fathom Five" | |
| 23 Apr 2017 | A. L. Kennedy | John Adams | I Was Looking at the Ceiling and Then I Saw the Sky (excerpt) | |
| 23 Apr 2017 | A. L. Kennedy | Bach | Goldberg Variations BWV 988 (excerpt) | |
| 23 Apr 2017 | A. L. Kennedy | Traditional music | "S Trom an Direadh" | |
| 7 May 2017 | Gabriele Finaldi | Ravel | Piano Concerto in G major (2nd movement: Adagio assai) | |
| 7 May 2017 | Gabriele Finaldi | Puccini | "E lucevan le stelle" (from Tosca) | |
| 7 May 2017 | Gabriele Finaldi | Britten | War Requiem, Op. 66 (Sanctus) | |
| 7 May 2017 | Gabriele Finaldi | Messiaen | Saint François d'Assise (act 1, scene 3: The Kissing of the Leper) | |
| 7 May 2017 | Gabriele Finaldi | Camarón de la Isla | "La Saeta" | |
| 7 May 2017 | Gabriele Finaldi | Traditional music | "Vurria addaventare" | |
| 7 May 2017 | Gabriele Finaldi | Chris Martin | "A Sky Full of Stars" | |
| 21 May 2017 | Bettany Hughes | Traditional music | "Bu Yil Bekar Kalahm" | |
| 21 May 2017 | Bettany Hughes | William Lloyd Webber | Nocturne | |
| 21 May 2017 | Bettany Hughes | Flanders and Swann | "The Hippopotamus Song" | |
| 21 May 2017 | Bettany Hughes | Henry Purcell | "When I am Laid in Earth" (Dido and Aeneas) | |
| 21 May 2017 | Bettany Hughes | Kassiano | Troparion for Holy Wednesday | |
| 21 May 2017 | Bettany Hughes | Shostakovich | Symphony No. 5 (1st movement: Moderato) | |
| 21 May 2017 | Bettany Hughes | Traditional music | Skaros (Shepherds Song of Epiros) | |
| 4 Jun 2017 | Ivo van Hove | Brad Mehldau | Bard | |
| 4 Jun 2017 | Ivo van Hove | Bach | Pedal-exercitium in G minor, BWV 598 | |
| 4 Jun 2017 | Ivo van Hove | Joni Mitchell | Blue | |
| 4 Jun 2017 | Ivo van Hove | Shostakovich | Prelude and Fugue in C major, Op. 87, No. 1 | |
| 4 Jun 2017 | Ivo van Hove | Anton Webern | String Quartet, Op. 28 (1st movement: Massig) | |
| 4 Jun 2017 | Ivo van Hove | Rufus Wainwright | "Going to a Town" | |
| 4 Jun 2017 | Ivo van Hove | Ligeti | Sonata for solo cello (1st movement: Dialogo: Adagio, rubato, cantabile) | |
| 11 Jun 2017 | Nishat Khan | Imrat Khan | "Night at the Taj" | |
| 11 Jun 2017 | Nishat Khan | J. S. Bach | Mass in B minor (Kyrie) | |
| 11 Jun 2017 | Nishat Khan | Mozart | Symphony No. 40 in G minor, K. 550 (1st movement: Allegro) | |
| 11 Jun 2017 | Nishat Khan | Manuel de Falla | The Three-Cornered Hat (final dance) | |
| 11 Jun 2017 | Nishat Khan | Bruckner | Symphony No. 8 in C minor (2nd movement: Scherzo) | |
| 11 Jun 2017 | Nishat Khan | Britten | Peter Grimes (act 2: "Sunday Morning") | |
| 11 Jun 2017 | Nishat Khan | Traditional Gregorian chant | "Tibi dixit" | |
| 18 Jun 2017 | Patsy Rodenburg | Joseph Canteloube | Bailero (Songs of the Auvergne) | |
| 18 Jun 2017 | Patsy Rodenburg | Jean Sibelius | Symphony No. 5 (3rd movement: Allegro molto) | |
| 18 Jun 2017 | Patsy Rodenburg | Bach | "Erbarme dich" (St Matthew Passion) | |
| 18 Jun 2017 | Patsy Rodenburg | Philip Glass | String Quartet No. 5 | |
| 18 Jun 2017 | Patsy Rodenburg | Richard Strauss | "Im Abendrot" (from Four Last Songs) | |
| 18 Jun 2017 | Patsy Rodenburg | Antonio Ruiz-Pipó | Cancion y Danza No. 1 | |
| 18 Jun 2017 | Patsy Rodenburg | Joni Mitchell | Carey | |
| 25 Jun 2017 | Madeleine Thien | Mahler | Das Lied von der Erde: Der Abschied | |
| 25 Jun 2017 | Madeleine Thien | 賀綠汀 | Lullaby | |
| 25 Jun 2017 | Madeleine Thien | Abing | Moon Reflected on the Second Spring | |
| 25 Jun 2017 | Madeleine Thien | Bach | Goldberg Variations: Aria and Variation 15 | |
| 25 Jun 2017 | Madeleine Thien | Shostakovich | Symphony No. 5 in D minor, Op. 47 – 3: Largo | |
| 25 Jun 2017 | Madeleine Thien | Bach | Sonata for Violin and Harpichord, No. 4 in C minor, BWV 1017 – 1: Siciliano | |
| 25 Jun 2017 | Madeleine Thien | Leonard Cohen | "Dance Me to the End of Love" | |
| 2 Jul 2017 | Lindsey Davis | Schubert | Heidenröslein | |
| 2 Jul 2017 | Lindsey Davis | Tchaikovsky | Symphony No. 6 in B minor (3rd movement: Allegro molto vivace) | |
| 2 Jul 2017 | Lindsey Davis | Bach | Prelude in C minor, BWV 999 | |
| 2 Jul 2017 | Lindsey Davis | Mozart | Concerto in E♭ major for two pianos and orchestra, K. 365 | |
| 2 Jul 2017 | Lindsey Davis | Jean-Philippe Rameau | Les Sauvages (Les Indes Galantes) | |
| 2 Jul 2017 | Lindsey Davis | Antonín Dvořák | Slavonic Dance, Op. 46, No. 3 | |
| 2 Jul 2017 | Lindsey Davis | Berlioz | Roman Carnival Overture | |
| 9 Jul 2017 | Dan Pearson | Hildegard von Bingen | O spectabiles viri | |
| 9 Jul 2017 | Dan Pearson | Traditional music | "Tri byulbyula peyat" | |
| 9 Jul 2017 | Dan Pearson | Alice Coltrane | "Lovely Sky Boat" | |
| 9 Jul 2017 | Dan Pearson | Caetano Veloso | "Tonada de Luna Llena" | |
| 9 Jul 2017 | Dan Pearson | Margarita Lecuona | Babalu | |
| 9 Jul 2017 | Dan Pearson | Arvo Pärt | Fratres | |
| 9 Jul 2017 | Dan Pearson | Moondog | Oboe Round | |
| 16 Jul 2017 | Shirley Hughes | Alexander Scriabin | Piano Sonata No. 3 in F♯ minor (1st movement: Drammatico) | |
| 16 Jul 2017 | Shirley Hughes | Jimmy McHugh | "I Must Have That Man" | |
| 16 Jul 2017 | Shirley Hughes | Schubert | Der Lindenbaum (Winterreise) | |
| 16 Jul 2017 | Shirley Hughes | Mozart | "Voi che sapete" (The Marriage of Figaro) | |
| 16 Jul 2017 | Shirley Hughes | Beethoven | Symphony No. 1 in C major (1st movement) | |
| 16 Jul 2017 | Shirley Hughes | Mozart | Flute Concerto No. 1 in G major, K. 313 (2nd movement: Adagio) | |
| 16 Jul 2017 | Shirley Hughes | John Lennon and Paul McCartney | "She's Leaving Home" | |
| 6 Aug 2017 | Nick Davies | Beethoven | Symphony No. 6 in F "Pastoral" (2nd movement: Scene by the Brook) | Leipzig Gewandhaus Orchestra, conductor: Riccardo Chailly |
| 6 Aug 2017 | Nick Davies | Britten | Cuckoo! (Friday Afternoons) | Singer: John Hahessy. Singer: Michael Berkeley. |
| 6 Aug 2017 | Nick Davies | Rachmaninoff | Prelude in G♯ minor, Op. 32, No. 12 | Vladimir Ashkenazy |
| 6 Aug 2017 | Nick Davies | Samuel Barber | "Sure on this shining night" | Roger Vignoles (piano), Thomas Allen (baritone) |
| 6 Aug 2017 | Nick Davies | Mozart | Sinfonia Concertante in E♭ major, K. 364 (2nd movement: Andante) | Vilde Frang (violin), Maxim Rysanov (viola), Arcangelo ensemble, conductor: Jonathan Cohen |
| 6 Aug 2017 | Nick Davies | Herbert Howells | King David | Malcolm Martineau (piano), Lynne Dawson (soprano) |
| 6 Aug 2017 | Nick Davies | Ralph Vaughan Williams | "The Lark Ascending" | Pinchas Zukerman (violin), English Chamber Orchestra, conductor: Daniel Barenboim |
| 6 Aug 2017 | Nick Davies | John Lennon and Paul McCartney | "Blackbird" | The Beatles |
| 13 Aug 2017 | Vivien Duffield | Ravel | "Kaddish" (song 1 of Two Hebrew Songs) | Performers: Dalton Baldwin (piano), Jessye Norman (soprano) |
| 13 Aug 2017 | Vivien Duffield | Charles Dumont | "Non, je ne regrette rien" | Singer: Édith Piaf |
| 13 Aug 2017 | Vivien Duffield | Puccini | "Vissi d'arte" (from Tosca) | Maria Callas, Orchestra of the Royal Opera House, Covent Garden |
| 13 Aug 2017 | Vivien Duffield | Richard Strauss | An Alpine Symphony | Saito Kinen Orchestra, conductor: Daniel Harding |
| 13 Aug 2017 | Vivien Duffield | Verdi | "Di quella pira" (from Il trovatore) | Santa Cecilia Academy Rome Orchestra, conductor: Carlo Maria Giulini, singer: Plácido Domingo |
| 13 Aug 2017 | Vivien Duffield | Richard Wagner | "Höchsten Heiles Wunder!" (final chorus from Parsifal) | Orchestra of the Bayreuth Festival, Bayreuth Festival Chorus, conductor: Pierre Boulez |
| 13 Aug 2017 | Vivien Duffield | Haydn | "The Heavens Are Telling" (from The Creation) | City of Birmingham Symphony Orchestra, CBSO Chorus, conductor: Sir Simon Rattle |
| 27 Aug 2017 | Michael Craig-Martin | Erik Satie | Gnossienne No. 3 | Performer: Noriko Ogawa |
| 27 Aug 2017 | Michael Craig-Martin | Bach | Sarabande (Cello Suite No. 2 in D minor, BWV 1008) | Performer: Yo-Yo Ma |
| 27 Aug 2017 | Michael Craig-Martin | Bach | "Aria" (Goldberg Variations) | Performer: Glenn Gould |
| 27 Aug 2017 | Michael Craig-Martin | Verdi | Addio, del passato (La Traviata) | Singer: Maria Callas |
| 27 Aug 2017 | Michael Craig-Martin | Simeon ten Holt | Canto ostinato (excerpt) | Performers: Kees Wieringa, Polo de Haas |
| 27 Aug 2017 | Michael Craig-Martin | Georges Bizet | "Au fond du temple saint" (Les pêcheurs de perles) | Singers: Jussi Björling, Robert Merrill, RCA Victor Symphony Orchestra |
| 27 Aug 2017 | Michael Craig-Martin | Vivaldi | Vedro con mio diletto (Giustino) | Singer: Philippe Jaroussky, Ensemble Matheus, conductor: Jean-Christophe Spinosi |
| 3 Sep 2017 | Gwyneth Glyn | Guto Puw | Torri'r garreg – Overture | Orchestra: BBC National Orchestra of Wales. Conductor: Guto Puw. |
| 3 Sep 2017 | Gwyneth Glyn | Michael Tippett | Concerto for Double String Orchestra (2nd movement) | Orchestra: BBC Symphony Orchestra. Conductor: Andrew Davis. |
| 3 Sep 2017 | Gwyneth Glyn | Nikolai Rimsky-Korsakov | The Sea and Sinbad's Ship (Scheherazade) | Orchestra: London Philharmonic Orchestra. Conductor: Mariss Jansons. |
| 3 Sep 2017 | Gwyneth Glyn | Traditional music | "Y cariad cyntaf" | Singer: Meredydd Evans. |
| 3 Sep 2017 | Gwyneth Glyn | Traditional music | "Teri Aankhon Mein" (Seren Syw) | Singer: Tahseef Akhbar. Singer: Gwyneth Gwyn. |
| 3 Sep 2017 | Gwyneth Glyn | Traditional music | "Woh dil hi kya" | Singer: Jagjit Singh. |
| 3 Sep 2017 | Gwyneth Glyn | Tchaikovsky | Cherubic Hymn (Liturgy of St John Chrysostom) | Choir: State Chamber Choir of Moscow Conservatory. Conductor: Valery Kuzmich Polyansky. |
| 3 Sep 2017 | Gwyneth Glyn | Elizabeth Poston | "Jesus Christ the Apple Tree" | Singer: Aled Jones. Choir: BBC Welsh Chamber Choir. |
| 10 Sep 2017 | Sebastian Barry | Max Bruch | Violin Concerto No. 1 in G minor (1st movement) | Performer: Chloë Hanslip, London Symphony Orchestra, conductor: Martyn Brabbins |
| 10 Sep 2017 | Sebastian Barry | Traditional music | "Quiet Land of Erin" | Singer: Mary O'Hara |
| 10 Sep 2017 | Sebastian Barry | Debussy | "Doctor Gradus ad Parnassum" (Children's Corner) | Performer: Jean-Efflam Bavouzet |
| 10 Sep 2017 | Sebastian Barry | Traditional music | "O Death" | Singer: Ralph Stanley |
| 10 Sep 2017 | Sebastian Barry | Handel | "Sound an alarm" (from Judas Maccabaeus) | London Symphony Orchestra, conductor: Sir Malcolm Sargent, singer: Richard Lewis |
| 10 Sep 2017 | Sebastian Barry | Joaquín Rodrigo | Concierto de Aranjuez (3rd movement: Allegro con Spirito) | Performer: Julian Bream, Chamber Orchestra of Europe, conductor: John Eliot Gardiner |
| 10 Sep 2017 | Sebastian Barry | Bach | Cello Suite No. 1, BWV 1007 (Prelude) | Performer: Mstislav Rostropovich |
| 10 Sep 2017 | Sebastian Barry | Traditional music | 2The Three Ravens2 | Performer: Desmond Dupré, singer: Alfred Deller |
| 24 Sep 2017 | Stephen Poliakoff | Mozart | Concerto for Flute, Harp and Orchestra, K. 299 (1st movement: Allegro) | Performers: Nicanor Zabaleta (harp), Wolfgang Schulz (flute), orchestra: Vienna Philharmonic, conductor: Karl Böhm |
| 24 Sep 2017 | Stephen Poliakoff | Haydn | Symphony No. 49 in F minor (1st movement: Adagio) | Orchestra: Bath Festival Orchestra. Conductor: Yehudi Menuhin. |
| 24 Sep 2017 | Stephen Poliakoff | Adrian Johnston | "Johnnie" (The Lost Prince) | Performer: Terry Davies. |
| 24 Sep 2017 | Stephen Poliakoff | Michael Tippett | Concerto for double string orchestra (1st movement) | Orchestra: Moscow Chamber Orchestra. Orchestra: Bath Festival Orchestra. Conductor: Rudolf Barshai. |
| 24 Sep 2017 | Stephen Poliakoff | Bach | O Jesu Christ, meins Lebens Licht, BWV 118 | Orchestra: Bach-Collegium Stuttgart, conductor: Helmuth Rilling |
| 24 Sep 2017 | Stephen Poliakoff | Georges Delerue | Grand Choral (La Nuit Americaine) | Performer: Original Soundtrack recording. |
| 24 Sep 2017 | Stephen Poliakoff | Handel | Oboe concerto in G minor, HWV 287 (1st movement: Grave) | Performer: Heinz Holliger, orchestra: English Chamber Orchestra, conductor: Raymond Leppard |
| 1 Oct 2017 | Maurice Riordan | Traditional music | "Oro se do bheatha abhaile" | Singer: Darach Ó Catháin. |
| 1 Oct 2017 | Maurice Riordan | Samuel Barber | "The Monk and his Cat" (Hermit Songs) | Performer: Samuel Barber. Singer: Leontyne Price. |
| 1 Oct 2017 | Maurice Riordan | Anonymous work | "Dies Irae" | Choir: Aurora Surgit. |
| 1 Oct 2017 | Maurice Riordan | Astor Piazzolla | "Jacinto Chiclana" | Astor Piazzolla (bandoneon), Edmundo Rivero (vocal), Quinteto Tango Nuevo |
| 1 Oct 2017 | Maurice Riordan | Debussy | Prelude a l'apres-midi d'un faune | Orchestra: Boston Symphony Orchestra. Conductor: Michael Tilson Thomas. |
| 1 Oct 2017 | Maurice Riordan | Monteverdi | Possente Spirto (L'Orfeo) | Ensemble: Le Concert d'Astrée. Conductor: Emmanuelle Haïm. Singer: Ian Bostridge. |
| 1 Oct 2017 | Maurice Riordan | Traditional music | Moses Ritoolarilay | Singer: Margaret Barry. |
| 8 Oct 2017 | Hildegard Bechtler | Wagner | Götterdämmerung (final scene) | Orchestra: Orchester der Bayreuther Festspiele. Conductor: Karl Böhm. |
| 8 Oct 2017 | Hildegard Bechtler | Thomas Adès | Powder her Face (opening) | Ensemble: Almeida Ensemble. Conductor: Thomas Adès. Singer: Valdine Anderson. Singer: Niall Morris. |
| 8 Oct 2017 | Hildegard Bechtler | Traditional music | "Taruna Jaya" | Ensemble: Gamelan Ensemble. |
| 8 Oct 2017 | Hildegard Bechtler | Traditional music | "Now Westlin' Winds" | Singer: Dick Gaughan. |
| 8 Oct 2017 | Hildegard Bechtler | Berlioz | La Damnation de Faust (Easter Hymn) | Orchestra: London Symphony Orchestra. Conductor: Colin Davis. Singer: Giuseppe Sabbatini. |
| 8 Oct 2017 | Hildegard Bechtler | Bob Dylan | "She Belongs to Me" | Singer: Bob Dylan. |
| 8 Oct 2017 | Hildegard Bechtler | Hildegard von Bingen | "O vis aeternitatis" | Ensemble: Sequentia Ensemble. |
| 15 Oct 2017 | Sir Simon Wessely | Bach | Partita in A minor for solo flute, BWV 1013 (1st movement: Allemande) | Performer: Jean-Pierre Rampal |
| 15 Oct 2017 | Sir Simon Wessely | Puccini | La Bohème (act 3, excerpt) | Orchestra: Berlin Philharmonic Orchestra. Conductor: Herbert von Karajan. Singer: Mirella Freni. Singer: Luciano Pavarotti. |
| 15 Oct 2017 | Sir Simon Wessely | Frank Loesser | "Adelaide's Lament" (Guys and Dolls) | Singer: Julia McKenzie. |
| 15 Oct 2017 | Sir Simon Wessely | Brahms | Violin Concerto in D major (1st movement: Allegro non troppo) | Performer: Isaac Stern. Orchestra: New York Philharmonic. Conductor: Zubin Mehta. |
| 15 Oct 2017 | Sir Simon Wessely | Mozart | Don Giovanni (act 3, excerpt) | Orchestra: London Philharmonic Orchestra, conductor: Georg Solti, singer: Bryn Terfel |
| 15 Oct 2017 | Sir Simon Wessely | Leonard Bernstein | "Gee Officer Krupke" (West Side Story) | Ensemble: Unknown. |
| 15 Oct 2017 | Sir Simon Wessely | Antonín Dvořák | String Quartet in F major, Op. 96 (American) (1st movement: Allegro ma non troppo) | Ensemble: Lindsay String Quartet. |
| 22 Oct 2017 | Allan Corduner | Schubert | Fantasia in F minor | Performer: Murray Perahia. Performer: Radu Lupu. |
| 22 Oct 2017 | Allan Corduner | Alexander Scriabin | Etude in D♯ minor, Op. 8, no. 12 | Performer: Vladimir Horowitz. |
| 22 Oct 2017 | Allan Corduner | Max Bruch | Kol Nidrei, Op. 47 | Performer: Jacqueline du Pré. Orchestra: Israel Philharmonic Orchestra. Conductor: Daniel Barenboim. |
| 22 Oct 2017 | Allan Corduner | Bach | "Aria" (Goldberg Variations, BWV 988) | Performer: Glenn Gould |
| 22 Oct 2017 | Allan Corduner | Jean Sibelius | Violin Concerto in D minor, Op. 47 (1st movement: Allegro moderato) | Performer: Maxim Vengerov. Orchestra: Chicago Symphony Orchestra. Conductor: Daniel Barenboim. |
| 22 Oct 2017 | Allan Corduner | Stephen Sondheim | "Send in the Clowns" (A Little Night Music) | Singer: Judi Dench. |
| 29 Oct 2017 | Vesna Goldsworthy | Iosif Ivanovici | The Danube Waves | Performer: Vienna Volksoper Orchestra. Conductor: Franz Bauer-Theussl. |
| 29 Oct 2017 | Vesna Goldsworthy | St Nectarios of Aegina | "Agni partene" (O virgin pure) | Performer: Divna Ljubojević. |
| 29 Oct 2017 | Vesna Goldsworthy | Manuel Valls | Adio querida | Performer: Yasmin Levy. |
| 29 Oct 2017 | Vesna Goldsworthy | Nikita Bogoslovsky | Dark is the night | Orchestra: Moscow Chamber Orchestra. Conductor: Constantine Orbelian. Singer: Dmitri Hvorostovsky. |
| 29 Oct 2017 | Vesna Goldsworthy | Tchaikovsky | Marche slave | Orchestra: London Symphony Orchestra. Conductor: Kenneth Alwyn. |
| 29 Oct 2017 | Vesna Goldsworthy | Henry Purcell | When I am laid in earth (Dido and Aeneas) | Orchestra: Philharmonia Baroque Orchestra & Chorale. Conductor: Nicholas McGegan. Singer: Lorraine Hunt Lieberson. |
| 5 Nov 2017 | Ronan Bennett | Thomas Tallis | "If Ye Love Me" | Choir: Tallis Scholars. |
| 5 Nov 2017 | Ronan Bennett | Richard Strauss | "Beim Schlafengehen" (from Four Last Songs) | Orchestra: Gewandhausorchester Leipzig, singer: Jessye Norman |
| 5 Nov 2017 | Ronan Bennett | Traditional music | "Women of Ireland" | Ensemble: The Chieftains. |
| 5 Nov 2017 | Ronan Bennett | Chopin | Nocturne in C♯ minor | Performer: Vladimir Ashkenazy. |
| 5 Nov 2017 | Ronan Bennett | Kano | Little Sis | Performer: Kano. |
| 5 Nov 2017 | Ronan Bennett | Berlioz | Nuit d'Ivresse (Les Troyens) | Orchestra: Orchestra of the Royal Opera House, Covent Garden. Conductor: Richard Armstrong. Singer: Roberto Alagna. Singer: Angela Gheorghiu. |
| 5 Nov 2017 | Ronan Bennett | Hans Zimmer | "You're so Cool" | Performer: Soundtrack. |
| 5 Nov 2017 | Ronan Bennett | Justin Burnham | "Skinny Love" | Ensemble: Bon Iver. |
| 12 Nov 2017 | Simon Sebag Montefiore | Tchaikovsky | 1812 Overture | Orchestra: Minnesota Orchestra. Conductor: Antal Doráti. |
| 12 Nov 2017 | Simon Sebag Montefiore | Sergei Prokofiev | Peter and the Wolf | Orchestra: Philharmonia Orchestra. Conductor: Philip Ellis. Narrator: Peter Ustinov. |
| 12 Nov 2017 | Simon Sebag Montefiore | Verdi | "Celeste Aida" (Aida) | Orchestra: La Scala Orchestra, Milan. Conductor: Lorin Maazel. Singer: Luciano Pavarotti. |
| 12 Nov 2017 | Simon Sebag Montefiore | Leonard Cohen | "Chelsea Hotel No. 2" | Performer: Rufus Wainwright. |
| 12 Nov 2017 | Simon Sebag Montefiore | Wagner | "Selig, wie die Sonne" (Die Meistersinger von Nurnberg) | Orchestra: London Philharmonic Orchestra. Conductor: Vladimir Jurowski. Singer: Gerald Finley. |
| 12 Nov 2017 | Simon Sebag Montefiore | יהורם גאון | Hasar Moshe Montefiore | Singer: יהורם גאון. |
| 12 Nov 2017 | Simon Sebag Montefiore | Mozart | Piano Sonata in A major, K. 331 (3rd movement: Rondo alla Turca) | Performer: Mitsuko Uchida |
| 12 Nov 2017 | Simon Sebag Montefiore | Mick Jagger | "Sympathy for the Devil" | Ensemble: The Rolling Stones. |
| 19 Nov 2017 | John Surman | John Surman | SAS Blues | Performer: John Surman. Performer: Karin Krog. |
| 19 Nov 2017 | John Surman | Bach | "Kommt, ihr Töchter" (St Matthew Passion) | Orchestra: Münchener Bach-Chor and Orchestra, conductor: Karl Richter |
| 19 Nov 2017 | John Surman | Traditional music | "Blow the Wind Southerly" | Singer: Kathleen Ferrier. |
| 19 Nov 2017 | John Surman | Duke Ellington | "The Star-crossed Lovers" (Such Sweet Thunder) | km_ Billy Strayhorn. Performer: Duke Ellington. |
| 19 Nov 2017 | John Surman | Béla Bartók | Concerto for Orchestra (4th movement: Intermezzo) | Orchestra: The Philadelphia Orchestra. Conductor: Christoph Eschenbach. |
| 19 Nov 2017 | John Surman | Harry Ruby | "Three Little Words" | Performer: Sonny Rollins. |
| 19 Nov 2017 | John Surman | George Gershwin | "Gone" | Performer: Miles Davis. |
| 19 Nov 2017 | John Surman | Beethoven | Sonata in C minor, Op. 13 ("Pathétique") (2nd movement: Adagio cantabile) | Performer: Ingrid Fliter |
| 3 Dec 2017 | Susan Richards (WorldCat, VIAF 100320328) | Iegor Reznikoff | Grand Magnificat (Liturgie Fondamentale) | Singer: Iegor Reznikoff. |
| 3 Dec 2017 | Susan Richards (WorldCat, VIAF 100320328) | Alexander Scriabin | Piano Sonata No. 9, Op. 68 | Performer: Vladimir Horowitz. |
| 3 Dec 2017 | Susan Richards (WorldCat, VIAF 100320328) | Stravinsky | The Rite of Spring | Orchestra: City of Birmingham Symphony Orchestra. |
| 3 Dec 2017 | Susan Richards (WorldCat, VIAF 100320328) | Shostakovich | Cello Sonata in D minor, Op. 40 (2nd movement: Allegro) | Performer: Daniil Borisovich Shafran. Performer: Dmitry Shostakovich. |
| 3 Dec 2017 | Susan Richards (WorldCat, VIAF 100320328) | Sergei Prokofiev | Piano Sonata No. 7, Op. 83 (1st movement: Allegro inquieto) | Performer: Sviatoslav Richter. |
| 3 Dec 2017 | Susan Richards (WorldCat, VIAF 100320328) | Elena Kamburova | Poem by Vladimir Vysotsky | Singer: Elena Kamburova. |
| 3 Dec 2017 | Susan Richards (WorldCat, VIAF 100320328) | Sofia Gubaidulina | "Et Expecto" | Performer: Geir Draugsvoll. |
| 10 Dec 2017 | Michael Frayn | Beethoven | Violin Sonata in F major, Op. 24 ("Spring") – 1st movement: Allegro | Performer: Itzhak Perlman. Performer: Vladimir Ashkenazy. |
| 10 Dec 2017 | Michael Frayn | Sergei Prokofiev | Violin Concerto No. 1 in D major, Op. 19 – 1st movement: Andantino | Performer: David Oistrakh. Orchestra: State Academic Symphony Orchestra of The Russian Federation. Conductor: Kyrill Kondrashin. |
| 10 Dec 2017 | Michael Frayn | Mahler | Ich atmet' einen linden Duft; Blicke mir nicht in die Lieder (Ruckert-Lieder) | Orchestra: Berlin Philharmonic Orchestra. Conductor: Karl Bohm. Singer: Dietrich Fischer-Dieskau. |
| 10 Dec 2017 | Michael Frayn | Muriel Herbert | The Lake Isle of Innisfree | Singer: James Gilchrist. Performer: David Owen Norris. |
| 10 Dec 2017 | Michael Frayn | Mozart | Lo sposo deluso – overture | Orchestra: Antwerp Transparant Chamber Opera, conductor: Hans Rotman |
| 10 Dec 2017 | Michael Frayn | Brahms | String Sextet in G major, Op. 36 – 2nd movement: Scherzo | Ensemble: Raphael Ensemble. |
| 10 Dec 2017 | Michael Frayn | Bob Brookmeyer | Open Country | Ensemble: Gerry Mulligan Quartet. |
| 17 Dec 2017 | Jane Birkin | Serge Gainsbourg | "Je t'aime" | Performer: Serge Gainsbourg. Performer: Jane Birkin. |
| 17 Dec 2017 | Jane Birkin | Stravinsky | The Rite of Spring | Orchestra: Mariinsky Orchestra. Conductor: Valery Gergiev. |
| 17 Dec 2017 | Jane Birkin | John Barry | Chinon-Eleanor's Arrival (The Lion in Winter) | Orchestra: City of Prague Philharmonic Orchestra. Conductor: Nic Raine. Choir: Crouch End Festival Chorus. |
| 17 Dec 2017 | Jane Birkin | Mahler | Symphony No. 10 (1st movement: Adagio) | Orchestra: Zurich Tonhalle Orchestra. Conductor: David Zinman. |
| 17 Dec 2017 | Jane Birkin | Gregorio Allegri | Miserere | Choir: King'S College Cambridge Choir. Conductor: Stephen Cleobury. |
| 17 Dec 2017 | Jane Birkin | Olivier Messaien | Turangalila-symphonie (5th movement: Joie du sang des etoiles) | Orchestra: Toronto Symphony Orchestra. Conductor: Seiji Ozawa. |
| 17 Dec 2017 | Jane Birkin | Leonard Bernstein | West Side Story – Overture | Conductor: Leonard Bernstein |
| 31 Dec 2017 | Alfred Brendel | Fred Raymond | "Ich reiss mir eine Wimper aus" | Performer: Max Hansen. |
| 31 Dec 2017 | Alfred Brendel | Carlo Gesualdo | Non t'amo, o voce ingrata | Choir: Delitiæ Musicæ. Conductor: Marco Longhini. |
| 31 Dec 2017 | Alfred Brendel | Jan Dismas Zelenka | Trio Sonata No. 6 in C minor (2nd movement: Allegro) | Heinz Holliger. Maurice Bourgue. Klaus Thunemann. |
| 31 Dec 2017 | Alfred Brendel | Bach | Brandenburg Concerto No. 5 (1st movement, cadenza) | Performer: Alfred Cortot, orchestra of the École normale de musique de Paris |
| 31 Dec 2017 | Alfred Brendel | Beethoven | String Quartet in A minor, Op. 132 (3rd movement: Heiliger Dankgesang) | Ensemble: Busch Quartet |
| 31 Dec 2017 | Alfred Brendel | Schubert | "Die Junge Nonne" | Performer: Edwin Fischer. Singer: Elisabeth Schwarzkopf. |
| 31 Dec 2017 | Alfred Brendel | Liszt | Piano Concerto No. 1 in E♭ (2nd movement: Quasi Adagio) | Performer: Wilhelm Kempff. Orchestra: London Symphony Orchestra. Conductor: Anatole Fistoulari. |
| 31 Dec 2017 | Alfred Brendel | Bizet | Michaela's Aria (Carmen, act 3) | Orchestra: Philharmonia Orchestra. Conductor: Alceo Galliera. Singer: Elisabeth Schwarzkopf. |

== 2018 ==
| Date | Guest | Composer | Title | Performer |
|---|---|---|---|---|
| 14 Jan 2018 | Helen Czerski | Donald Swann | First and Second Law | Performer: Michael Flanders. Performer: Donald Swann. |
| 14 Jan 2018 | Helen Czerski | Antonín Dvořák | Symphony No. 9 (From the New World) (Finale) | Orchestra: Malaysian Philharmonic Orchestra, conductor: Claus Peter Flor |
| 14 Jan 2018 | Helen Czerski | Johann Strauss II | "Champagner-Polka" | Orchestra: Wiener Johann Strauss Orchester, conductor: Willi Boskovsky. |
| 14 Jan 2018 | Helen Czerski | Bach | Concerto in D minor (Adagio) | Music arranger: Jacques Loussier, ensemble: Jacques Loussier Trio. |
| 14 Jan 2018 | Helen Czerski | Verdi | Il Trovatore (Anvil Chorus) | Orchestra: London Symphony Orchestra. Conductor: Sir Antonio Pappano. Choir: London Voices. |
| 14 Jan 2018 | Helen Czerski | Rossini | Barber of Seville (Largo al Factotum) | Orchestra: Philharmonia Orchestra. Singer: Dmitri Hvorostovsky. |
| 14 Jan 2018 | Helen Czerski | Camille Saint-Saëns | Carnival of the Animals (Fossils) | Performer: John Ogdon. Performer: Brenda Lucas. Orchestra: City of Birmingham Symphony Orchestra. Conductor: Louis Frémaux. |
| 21 Jan 2018 | Alistair Spalding | Debussy | Prelude a l'apres-midi d'un faune | Orchestra: Philharmonia Orchestra. Conductor: Pierre Boulez. |
| 21 Jan 2018 | Alistair Spalding | Leonard Bernstein | "America" (West Side Story) | Performer: Chita Rivera. Performer: Marilyn Cooper. |
| 21 Jan 2018 | Alistair Spalding | Bach | "Ich ruf zu dir, Herr Jesu Christ, BWV 639" | Performer: Alfred Brendel, arrangement: Ferruccio Busoni |
| 21 Jan 2018 | Alistair Spalding | Thomas Adès | Polaris | Orchestra: London Symphony Orchestra. Conductor: Thomas Adès. |
| 21 Jan 2018 | Alistair Spalding | Nick Cave | Skeleton Tree | Performer: Nick Cave. |
| 21 Jan 2018 | Alistair Spalding | Joni Mitchell | "Amelia" | Performer: Joni Mitchell. |
| 21 Jan 2018 | Alistair Spalding | Monteverdi | Adagiati, Poppea (L'Incoronazione di Poppea) | Orchestra: Royal Philharmonic Orchestra. Conductor: John Pritchard. Singer: Magda László. |
| 28 Jan 2018 | Eleanor Rosamund Barraclough | Frode Fjellheim | Eatnamen Vuelie | Choir: Cantus. Conductor: Tove Ramlo-Ystad. |
| 28 Jan 2018 | Eleanor Rosamund Barraclough | Traditional music | "Voluspa" | Performer: Sveinbjörn Beinteinsson. |
| 28 Jan 2018 | Eleanor Rosamund Barraclough | Jean Sibelius | Symphony No. 5 (3rd movement: Allegro) | Orchestra: New York Philharmonic. Conductor: Leonard Bernstein. |
| 28 Jan 2018 | Eleanor Rosamund Barraclough | Handel | "Eternal Source of Light Divine" (Ode for the Birthday of Queen Anne) | Performer: Alison Balsom (trumpet), singer: Iestyn Davies (countertenor), ensemble: The English Concert |
| 28 Jan 2018 | Eleanor Rosamund Barraclough | Traditional music | 2Lord Franklin" | Performer: Martin Carthy. |
| 28 Jan 2018 | Eleanor Rosamund Barraclough | Eriks Esenvalds | Northern Lights | Choir: Trinity College Cambridge Choir. Conductor: Stephen Layton. |
| 28 Jan 2018 | Eleanor Rosamund Barraclough | Wardruna | "Rotlaust tre fell" | Ensemble: Wardruna. |
| 28 Jan 2018 | Eleanor Rosamund Barraclough | Geoffrey Burgon | "Aslan's Theme" (The Chronicles of Narnia) | Orchestra: Philharmonia Orchestra. |
| 11 Feb 2018 | Bernard Cornwell | Gabriel Fauré | In Paradisum (Requiem) | Ensemble: Schola Cantorum of Oxford. Conductor: Jeremy Summerly. |
| 11 Feb 2018 | Bernard Cornwell | Schubert | "An Sylvia" | Ensemble: The King's Singers. |
| 11 Feb 2018 | Bernard Cornwell | Mitch Leigh | The Impossible Dream (The Man of La Mancha) | Singer: Brian Stokes Mitchell. |
| 11 Feb 2018 | Bernard Cornwell | Mozart | "Lux Aeterna" (Requiem) | Orchestra: Staatskapelle Dresden, singers: Margaret Price, Peter Schreier, choir: Leipzig Radio Choir |
| 11 Feb 2018 | Bernard Cornwell | Thomas Morley | "It was a Lover and his Lass" | Performer: Elizabeth Kenny. Singer: Charles Daniels. |
| 11 Feb 2018 | Bernard Cornwell | Gregorio Allegri | Miserere | Choir: Tenebrae. Conductor: Nigel Short. |
| 11 Feb 2018 | Bernard Cornwell | Cole Porter | "I Get a Kick out of You" (Anything Goes) | Singer: Kim Criswell. |
| 18 Feb 2018 | Bishi | Bishi | The Good Immigrant | Performer: Bishi. |
| 18 Feb 2018 | Bishi | Philip Glass | Prashanti | km_ Ravi Shankar. Performer: Ravi Shankar. Performer: Philip Glass. |
| 18 Feb 2018 | Bishi | Rossini | Overture: La Gazza Ladra | Ensemble: Soundtrack. |
| 18 Feb 2018 | Bishi | Rossini | Overture: La Gazza Ladra | km_ Wendy Carlos. Performer: Wendy Carlos. |
| 18 Feb 2018 | Bishi | Stravinsky | Petrushka | Orchestra: London Symphony Orchestra. Conductor: Claudio Abbado. |
| 18 Feb 2018 | Bishi | Ennio Morricone | "The Ecstasy of Gold" (The Good, The Bad and The Ugly) | Orchestra: Studio Orchestra. Conductor: Ennio Morricone. |
| 18 Feb 2018 | Bishi | Mica Levi | "Lonely Void" | Ensemble: Ensemble. Conductor: Peter Raeburn. |
| 18 Feb 2018 | Bishi | Meredith Monk | Turtle Dreams | Performer: Meridith Monk. |
| 18 Feb 2018 | Bishi | Peter Liondev | "Kaval sviri" | Ensemble: Trakia Ensemble. |
| 4 Mar 2018 | Katherine Grainger | Chopin | Nocturne in C♯ minor, Op. posth. | Performer: Kathryn Stott. |
| 4 Mar 2018 | Katherine Grainger | Mahler | Symphony No. 6 (1st movement) | Orchestra: Hamburg Philharmonic Orchestra. Conductor: Simone Young. |
| 4 Mar 2018 | Katherine Grainger | Verdi | La Donna e mobile (Rigoletto) | Orchestra: London Symphony Orchestra. Conductor: Richard Bonynge. Singer: Luciano Pavarotti. |
| 4 Mar 2018 | Katherine Grainger | Rachmaninoff | Piano Concerto No. 2 in C minor (2nd movement) | Performer: Valentina Lisitsa. Orchestra: London Symphony Orchestra. Conductor: Michael Francis. |
| 4 Mar 2018 | Katherine Grainger | Mozart | "Voi che sapete" (The Marriage of Figaro) | Orchestra: Vienna Philharmonic, conductor: Riccardo Muti, singer: Ann Murray |
| 4 Mar 2018 | Katherine Grainger | Elgar | "Softly and Gently" (The Dream of Gerontius) | Orchestra: Hallé. Conductor: John Barbirolli. Singer: Janet Baker. |
| 4 Mar 2018 | Katherine Grainger | Vivaldi | Concerto in D major, BWV 972 | Performer: Alison Balsom, Colm Carey (organ), arrangement: Johann Sebastian Bach |
| 11 Mar 2018 | Richard Flanagan | Johann Paul Westhoff | Violin Sonata No. 3 | Performer: Daniel Hope. Music Arranger: Christian Badzura. Orchestra: Kammerorchester Berlin. Conductor: Simon Halsey. |
| 11 Mar 2018 | Richard Flanagan | Serge Gainsbourg | "Valse de Melodie" | Singer: Jane Birkin. |
| 11 Mar 2018 | Richard Flanagan | John Field | Nocturne No. 6 in F | Performer: Benjamin Frith. |
| 11 Mar 2018 | Richard Flanagan | Chopin | Nocturne in F minor, Op. 55, No. 1 | Performer: Chad Lawson. Music Arranger: Chad Lawson. |
| 11 Mar 2018 | Richard Flanagan | Mikis Theodorakis | Hassapiko Dance (Zorbas) | Orchestra: Orchestre symphonique de Montréal. Conductor: Charles Dutoit. Choir: Montreal Symphony Chorus. |
| 11 Mar 2018 | Richard Flanagan | Cezary Skubiszewski | "For There is This" (The Sound of One Hand Clapping) | Orchestra: Victorian Philharmonic Orchestra. Conductor: Cezary Skubiszewski. |
| 11 Mar 2018 | Richard Flanagan | Arvo Pärt | "Vater Unser" | Performer: Arvo Pärt. Singer: Heldur Harry Põlda. |
| 11 Mar 2018 | Richard Flanagan | Bach | "Aria" (Goldberg Variations) | Performer: Glenn Gould |
| 25 Mar 2018 | Xavier Bray | Verdi | Nessun maggior dolore (Otello) | Orchestra: Philharmonia Orchestra. Conductor: Jesús López Cobos. Singer: Alfonso Leoz. |
| 25 Mar 2018 | Xavier Bray | Handel | "Ombra mai fu" (from Serse) | Conductor: John Barbirolli, singer: Beniamino Gigli |
| 25 Mar 2018 | Xavier Bray | Wagner | Pilgrims' Chorus (Tannhauser) | Orchestra: Bavarian Radio Symphony Orchestra. Conductor: Bernard Haitink. Choir: Chor des Bayerischen Rundfunks. |
| 25 Mar 2018 | Xavier Bray | Paco Peña | "Misa flamenca" | Performer: Paco Peña. Orchestra: Academy of St Martin in the Fields. Conductor: László Heltay. |
| 25 Mar 2018 | Xavier Bray | Tomás Luis de Victoria | "O vos omnes" | Choir: The Sixteen. Conductor: Harry Christophers. |
| 25 Mar 2018 | Xavier Bray | Messiaen | Saint François d'Assise (excerpt) | Orchestra: The Hallé, conductor: Kent Nagano, choir: Arnold Schoenberg Choir |
| 25 Mar 2018 | Xavier Bray | Bayarbaatar Davaasuren | Mongolian Throat Singing | Singer: Bayarbaatar Davaasuren. |
| 25 Mar 2018 | Xavier Bray | Marin Marais | Le Badinage | |
| 25 Mar 2018 | Xavier Bray | Bizet | Je crois entendre encore (Les Pecheurs de perles) | Singer: Alain Vanzo. |
| 1 Apr 2018 | Richard Coles | Leoš Janáček | "The Barn Owl Has Not Flown Away!" (from On an Overgrown Path) | Performer: Rudolf Firkušný |
| 1 Apr 2018 | Richard Coles | Ann Ronell | "Willow Weep for Me" | Performer: Art Tatum |
| 1 Apr 2018 | Richard Coles | Mozart | Symphony No. 41 in C major, K. 551 (Jupiter) (4th movement) | Orchestra: Freiburger Barockorchester, conductor: René Jacobs |
| 1 Apr 2018 | Richard Coles | Peter Wishart | Jesu, dulcis memoria | Choir: Choir of New College Oxford, conductor: Edward Higginbottom |
| 1 Apr 2018 | Richard Coles | Richard Wagner | Die Meistersinger von Nürnberg (act 3, prelude) | Orchestra: Vienna Philharmonic, conductor: Wilhelm Furtwängler |
| 1 Apr 2018 | Richard Coles | Haydn | String Quartet in E♭ major, Op. 20, no. 1 (1st movement) | Ensemble: Emerson String Quartet |
| 1 Apr 2018 | Richard Coles | Anonymous work | "Haec Dies" (Gradual Mass of Easter) | Choir: Monks of St Pierre de Solemnes Abbey |
| 8 Apr 2018 | Phyllida Barlow | Leoš Janáček | String Quartet No. 2 "Intimate Letters" (2nd movement: Adagio) | Ensemble: Emerson String Quartet |
| 8 Apr 2018 | Phyllida Barlow | Harrison Birtwistle | Antiphonies (excerpt) | Performer: Joanna MacGregor, orchestra: Radio Filharmonisch Orkest, conductor: Michael Gielen |
| 8 Apr 2018 | Phyllida Barlow | Richard Wagner | "Mild und leise" ("Liebestod") from act 3 of Tristan und Isolde | Orchestra: Orchester der Bayreuther Festspiele, conductor: Karl Böhm, singer: Birgit Nilsson |
| 8 Apr 2018 | Phyllida Barlow | Abel Meeropol | "Strange Fruit" | Performer: Billie Holiday |
| 8 Apr 2018 | Phyllida Barlow | Messiaen | Turangalîla-Symphonie (8th movement: "Développement d’amour") | Orchestra: Amsterdam Royal Concertgebouw Orchestra, conductor: Riccardo Chailly |
| 8 Apr 2018 | Phyllida Barlow | Kayhan Kalhor | "I Will Not Stand Alone" | Performers: Kayhan Kalhor, Ali Bahrami Fard. |
| 8 Apr 2018 | Phyllida Barlow | Anton Webern | Five Pieces for Orchestra, Op. 10 | Orchestra: Philharmonia Orchestra, conductor: Robert Craft |
| 22 Apr 2018 | Anne Sebba | Felix Mendelssohn | Octet in E♭ major (3rd movement: Scherzo) | Ensemble: Ensemble. |
| 22 Apr 2018 | Anne Sebba | Rachmaninoff | Piano Concerto No. 2 in C minor (2nd movement: Adagio) | Performer: Arthur Rubinstein. Orchestra: Chicago Symphony Orchestra. Conductor: Fritz Reiner. |
| 22 Apr 2018 | Anne Sebba | Verdi | Don Carlo (act 4: Tu che le vanita) | Orchestra: Stuttgart Radio Symphony Orchestra. Conductor: Nicola Rescigno. Singer: Maria Callas. |
| 22 Apr 2018 | Anne Sebba | Arnold Bax | Symphonic Variations (No. 6: Triumph) | Performer: Margaret Fingerhut. Orchestra: London Philharmonic Orchestra. Conductor: Bryden Thomson. |
| 22 Apr 2018 | Anne Sebba | Germaine Tillion | Le Verfugbar aux Enfers | Ensemble: Ensemble. |
| 22 Apr 2018 | Anne Sebba | Kurt Weill | "The Ballad of Mack the Knife" | Orchestra: London Sinfonietta. Conductor: Dominic Muldowney. Singer: Robyn Archer. |
| 22 Apr 2018 | Anne Sebba | Chopin | Cello Sonata, Op. 65 (2nd movement) | Performer: Yo-Yo Ma. Performer: Emanuel Ax. |
| 6 May 2018 | Lubaina Himid | Vincenzo Bellini | "Mira, o Norma" (from Norma, act 3) | Singers: Joan Sutherland, Marilyn Horne, orchestra: London Symphony Orchestra, conductor: Richard Bonynge |
| 6 May 2018 | Lubaina Himid | Max Bruch | Kol Nidrei | Performers: Jacqueline du Pré (cello), performer: Gerald Moore (piano) |
| 6 May 2018 | Lubaina Himid | Donal MacDonagh Long | "Never Be the Sun" (see Ruby's Torch) | Performer: Dolores Keane |
| 6 May 2018 | Lubaina Himid | Keith Jarrett | The Köln Concert (part 1) | Performer: Keith Jarrett |
| 6 May 2018 | Lubaina Himid | Zbigniew Preisner | "Song for the Unification of Europe" | Orchestra: Sinfonia Varsovia, conductor: Wojciech Michniewski |
| 6 May 2018 | Lubaina Himid | Leoš Janáček | "They Chattered Like Swallows" (from On an Overgrown Path) | Performer: Leif Ove Andsnes |
| 6 May 2018 | Lubaina Himid | Bob Dylan | "Just Like a Woman" | Performer: Nina Simone |
| 20 May 2018 | Elisabeth Luard | Mozart | "Porgi amor" (The Marriage of Figaro) | Orchestra: Orchestra of the Royal Opera House, Covent Garden, conductor: Ion Marin, singer: Angela Gheorghiu |
| 20 May 2018 | Elisabeth Luard | Elgar | "Sanctus fortis, Sanctus Deus" (The Dream of Gerontius) | Orchestra: BBC Symphony Orchestra. Conductor: Sir Andrew Davis. Singer: Stuart Skelton. Choir: BBC Symphony Chorus. |
| 20 May 2018 | Elisabeth Luard | Paco de Lucía | El Adios | Ensemble: Amigos de Gines. |
| 20 May 2018 | Elisabeth Luard | Billie Holiday | "God Bless the Child" | Performer: Annie Ross. |
| 20 May 2018 | Elisabeth Luard | Dory Previn | "Jesus was an Androgyne" | Performer: Dory Previn. |
| 20 May 2018 | Elisabeth Luard | Beethoven | Sonata in C♯ minor, Op. 27, No. 2 ("Moonlight") (1st movement: Adagio sostenuto) | Performer: Radu Lupu |
| 27 May 2018 | Peter Florence | Mahler | Symphony No. 2 (Resurrection) (Finale) | Orchestra: City of Birmingham Symphony Orchestra. Conductor: Sir Simon Rattle. Singer: Janet Baker. |
| 27 May 2018 | Peter Florence | Glynn Jones | Dafydd u garreg wen | Performer: Annette Bryn Parri. Singer: Bryn Terfel. |
| 27 May 2018 | Peter Florence | Handel | Sarabande (from Suite No. 11 in D minor) | Performer: Igor Kipnis |
| 27 May 2018 | Peter Florence | Bach | Goldberg Variations, BWV 988 | Performer: Sir András Schiff |
| 27 May 2018 | Peter Florence | Anouar Brahem | "Le pas du chat noir" | Performer: Anouar Brahem. Performer: François Couturier. Performer: Jean-Louis Matinier. |
| 27 May 2018 | Peter Florence | George Gershwin | The Man that I love | Singer: Sarah Vaughan. |
| 17 Jun 2018 | Miranda Krestovnikoff | Bohuslav Martinu | Flute Sonata (3rd movement: Allegro) | Performer: Michael Cox. Performer: Nigel Clayton. |
| 17 Jun 2018 | Miranda Krestovnikoff | Michel Camilo | "Why Not?" | Performer: Michel Camilo. |
| 17 Jun 2018 | Miranda Krestovnikoff | Maurice Duruflé | "Ubi caritas" (Quatre motets sur des themes gregoriens) | Choir: Bristol University Singers. |
| 17 Jun 2018 | Miranda Krestovnikoff | Rachmaninoff | All-Night Vigil | Choir: Saint Petersburg Chamber Choir. Conductor: Nikolai Korniev. |
| 17 Jun 2018 | Miranda Krestovnikoff | Holst | Mercury (3rd movement from The Planets) | Orchestra: New York Philharmonic, conductor: Leonard Bernstein |
| 17 Jun 2018 | Miranda Krestovnikoff | Sting | "Fields of Gold" | Performer: Sting. |
| 17 Jun 2018 | Miranda Krestovnikoff | Ralph Vaughan Williams | "The Lover's Ghost" (Five English Folk Songs) | Choir: Finzi Singers. Conductor: Paul Spicer. |
| 17 Jun 2018 | Miranda Krestovnikoff | Bach | "Gigue" (Cello Suite No. 3) | Performer: Paul Tortelier |
| 17 Jun 2018 | Miranda Krestovnikoff | Stan Tracey | "Starless and Bible Black" | Ensemble: Stan Tracey Quartet. |
| 17 Jun 2018 | Miranda Krestovnikoff | Hermann von Reichenau | "Salve Regina" | Ensemble: The Hilliard Ensemble. |
| 17 Jun 2018 | Miranda Krestovnikoff | Shostakovich | String Quartet No. 15 in E♭ minor (1st movement: Elegy) | Ensemble: Fitzwilliam String Quartet. |
| 17 Jun 2018 | Miranda Krestovnikoff | Messiaen | Quartet for the end of time | Ensemble: Fibonacci Sequence |
| 17 Jun 2018 | Miranda Krestovnikoff | Haydn | Sonata in D major, H.16.42 (1st movement) | Performer: Glenn Gould. |
| 17 Jun 2018 | Miranda Krestovnikoff | Deborah Pritchard | River Above | Performer: Simon Haram. |
| 24 Jun 2018 | Kim Moore(WorldCat) | Alexander Arutunyan | Trumpet Concerto (1st movemenvt) | Performer: Alison Balsom. Orchestra: BBC Scottish Symphony Orchestra. Conductor: Lawrence Renes. |
| 24 Jun 2018 | Kim Moore(WorldCat) | Handel | "The trumpet shall sound" (from Messiah) | Orchestra: The Sixteen, conductor: Harry Christophers, singer: Christopher Purves |
| 24 Jun 2018 | Kim Moore(WorldCat) | Jean-Baptiste Arban | Variations on 'The Carnival of Venice' | Performer: Wynton Marsalis. Ensemble: Eastman Wind Ensemble. |
| 24 Jun 2018 | Kim Moore(WorldCat) | William Rimmer | Slaidburn | Performer: Wingates Temperance Band. |
| 24 Jun 2018 | Kim Moore(WorldCat) | Britten | (Elegy) Serenade for tenor, horn and strings | Performer: Jasper de Waal. Orchestra: Amsterdam Sinfonietta. Conductor: Candida Thompson. Singer: James Gilchrist. |
| 24 Jun 2018 | Kim Moore(WorldCat) | Joaquín Rodrigo | Adagio (Concierto de Aranjuez) | Performer: Grimethorpe Colliery Band. Music Arranger: Kevin Bolton. |
| 24 Jun 2018 | Kim Moore(WorldCat) | Dave McGerty | "You Can't Mean It" | Ensemble: Chapter 5. |
| 8 Jul 2018 | Adjoa Andoh | Ralph Vaughan Williams | Fantasia on Greensleeves | Orchestra: Academy of St Martin in the Fields. Conductor: Neville Marriner. |
| 8 Jul 2018 | Adjoa Andoh | Nikolai Rimsky-Korsakov | Scheherazade (Finale) | Performer: Sydney Harth. Orchestra: Chicago Symphony Orchestra. Conductor: Fritz Reiner. |
| 8 Jul 2018 | Adjoa Andoh | Pharoah Sanders | "The Creator Has A Master Plan2 | |
| 8 Jul 2018 | Adjoa Andoh | Holst | "Neptune" (7th movement from The Planets) | |
| 8 Jul 2018 | Adjoa Andoh | Dade Krama | Kronkohinkoo | Performer: Kweku Gablah. Performer: Dada Lamptey. Performer: Nii Noi Nortey. Performer: Nana Tsiboe. |
| 8 Jul 2018 | Adjoa Andoh | Puccini | "Nessun dorma" (Turandot) | Orchestra: Münchner Rundfunkorchester. Conductor: Roberto Abbado. Singer: Ben Heppner. |
| 8 Jul 2018 | Adjoa Andoh | Britten | Peter Grimes, act 1 ("The Truth, The Pity...") | Orchestra: City of London Sinfonia, conductor: Richard Hickox, singers: Philip Langridge, Janice Watson |
| 8 Jul 2018 | Adjoa Andoh | Leonard Bernstein | Quintet (West Side Story) | Performer: Jimmy Bryant. Performer: Marni Nixon. |
| 15 Jul 2018 | Paco Peña | Camarón de la Isla | "Se me partió la barrena" | Performer: Camarón de la Isla. |
| 15 Jul 2018 | Paco Peña | Beethoven | Sonata in C♯ minor, Op. 27, No. 2 ("Moonlight") (1st movement) | Performer: Alfred Brendel |
| 15 Jul 2018 | Paco Peña | Eduardo Falú | Tonada del viejo amor | Performer: Paco Peña. Singer: Eduardo Falú. |
| 15 Jul 2018 | Paco Peña | Bach | Chaconne from Partita for Violin No. 2 in D minor, BWV 1004 | Performer: Jascha Heifetz |
| 15 Jul 2018 | Paco Peña | Manuel de Falla | La vida breve (act 2, finale) | Orchestra: National Orchestra of Spain, conductor: Rafael Frühbeck de Burgos, singer: Victoria de los Ángeles |
| 15 Jul 2018 | Paco Peña | Mozart | "Requiem aeternam" (Requiem in D minor, K. 626) | Orchestra: Dunedin Consort & Players, conductor: John Butt, singer: Joanne Lunn |
| 15 Jul 2018 | Paco Peña | Bach | Fugue from Prelude, Fugue and Allegro in E♭ major, BWV 998 | Performer: John Williams (guitar) |
| 22 Jul 2018 | Audrey Niffenegger | Allein Gott | Toccata on the Chorale | Performer: Aivars Kalējs. |
| 22 Jul 2018 | Audrey Niffenegger | Hildegard von Bingen | "O virtus sapientie" | Ensemble: Kronos Quartet. |
| 22 Jul 2018 | Audrey Niffenegger | Radiohead | "Give up the Ghost" | Ensemble: Radiohead. |
| 22 Jul 2018 | Audrey Niffenegger | Charles Ives | Piano Sonata No. 2 (Concord MA) (3rd movement: The Alcotts) | Performer: Charles Ives. |
| 22 Jul 2018 | Audrey Niffenegger | Rachel's | First Self-Portrait Series (Music for Egon Schiele) | Ensemble: Rachel's. |
| 22 Jul 2018 | Audrey Niffenegger | Pauline Oliveros | "Lear" | Performer: Pauline Oliveros. Performer: Stuart Dempster. Performer: Panaiotis. |
| 22 Jul 2018 | Audrey Niffenegger | Astor Piazzolla | "Sur – Regresso al amor" | Yo-Yo Ma, Quinteto Tango Nuevo |
| 29 Jul 2018 | Henry Blofeld | Mozart | "Non più andrai" (The Marriage of Figaro, act 1) | Orchestra: Philharmonia Orchestra, conductor: Carlo Maria Giulini, singer: Giuseppe Taddei |
| 29 Jul 2018 | Henry Blofeld | Arthur Sullivan | "If you're anxious for to shine" (Patience) | Orchestra: D'Oyly Carte Opera Orchestra. Conductor: Malcolm Sargent. Singer: George Baker. |
| 29 Jul 2018 | Henry Blofeld | Schubert | Symphony No. 8 (Unfinished) | Orchestra: Boston Symphony Orchestra. Conductor: Colin Davis. |
| 29 Jul 2018 | Henry Blofeld | Burt Bacharach | "This Guy's in Love with You" | Performer: Herb Alpert. Ensemble: Tijuana Brass. |
| 29 Jul 2018 | Henry Blofeld | Noël Coward | "Mad Dogs and Englishmen" | Performer: Noël Coward. |
| 29 Jul 2018 | Henry Blofeld | Ravi Shankar | Dhun | Performer: Ravi Shankar. |
| 29 Jul 2018 | Henry Blofeld | Stephen Sondheim | "Send in the Clowns" (A Little Night Music) | Performer: Barbra Streisand. |
| 29 Jul 2018 | Henry Blofeld | Puccini | "E lucevan le stelle" (Tosca) | Orchestra: Royal Philharmonic Orchestra. Conductor: Leone Magiera. Singer: Luciano Pavarotti. |
| 5 Aug 2018 | Lauren Child | Erik Satie | Gnossienne No. 1 | Performer: Lang Lang. |
| 5 Aug 2018 | Lauren Child | Vivaldi | Mandolin Concerto in C (2nd movement) | Performer: Sol Goichberg. Orchestra: New York Sinfonietta. Conductor: Max Goberman. |
| 5 Aug 2018 | Lauren Child | Traditional Mongolian | "Erkhem Tur" | Ensemble: Ensemble. |
| 5 Aug 2018 | Lauren Child | Björk | Joga | Performer: Björk. Orchestrator: ONE LITTLE INDIAN. |
| 5 Aug 2018 | Lauren Child | Puccini | Chi il bel sogno di Doretta (La Rondine) | Orchestra: London Philharmonic Orchestra. Conductor: John Pritchard. Singer: Kiri Te Kanawa. |
| 5 Aug 2018 | Lauren Child | Arvo Pärt | Spiegel im Spiegel | Performer: Tasmin Little. Performer: Martin Roscoe. |
| 5 Aug 2018 | Lauren Child | Mozart | Clarinet Concerto in A major, K. 622 (2nd movement) | Performer: Sabine Meyer, orchestra: Staatskapelle Dresden, conductor: Hans Vonk |
| 2 Sep 2018 | Eugenia Cheng | Rachmaninoff | Piano Concerto No. 2 in C minor (1st movement: Moderato) | Performer: Sergei Rachmaninoff, orchestra: Philadelphia Orchestra, conductor: Leopold Stokowski |
| 2 Sep 2018 | Eugenia Cheng | Bach | "Erbarme dich" (St Matthew Passion) | Michael Chance (countertenor), English Baroque Soloists, conductor: Sir John Eliot Gardiner |
| 2 Sep 2018 | Eugenia Cheng | Leoš Janáček | The Makropulos Case (final scene) | Singer: Elisabeth Söderström, orchestra: Vienna Philharmonic, conductor: Charles Mackerras |
| 2 Sep 2018 | Eugenia Cheng | Schubert | "Der Doppelgänger" (no. 13 from Schwanengesang) | Performer: Justus Zeyen (piano), Thomas Quasthoff (bass-baritone) |
| 2 Sep 2018 | Eugenia Cheng | Britten | "From the gutter..." (from Peter Grimes, act 2) | Singers: Heather Harper (soprano), Elizabeth Bainbridge (contralto), Teresa Cahill (soprano), Anne Pashley (soprano); orchestra: Orchestra of the Royal Opera House, Covent Garden; conductor: Colin Davis |
| 2 Sep 2018 | Eugenia Cheng | Mahler | Symphony No. 2 ("Resurrection") (excerpt) | Orchestra: London Philharmonic Orchestra, conductor: Vladimir Jurowski, Choir: London Philharmonic Choir |
| 2 Sep 2018 | Eugenia Cheng | Richard Wagner | Die Meistersinger von Nürnberg (act 3, excerpt) | Orchestra: London Philharmonic Orchestra, conductor: Vladimir Jurowski, singer: Gerald Finley |
| 9 Sep 2018 | Steve Punt | Felix Mendelssohn | Overture: A Midsummer Night's Dream | Orchestra: Champs-Élysées Orchestra. Conductor: Philippe Herreweghe. |
| 9 Sep 2018 | Steve Punt | Dave Brubeck | "Blue Rondo a la Turk" | Performer: Dave Brubeck. |
| 9 Sep 2018 | Steve Punt | Dudley Moore | Bedazzled | Performer: Peter Cook. Ensemble: Dudley Moore Trio. |
| 9 Sep 2018 | Steve Punt | Jean Sibelius | Violin Concerto (3rd movement: Allegro, ma non tanto) | Performer: Jennifer Pike. Orchestra: Bergen Philharmonic Orchestra. Conductor: Sir Andrew Davis. |
| 9 Sep 2018 | Steve Punt | Debussy | Dr Gradus ad Parnassum (Children's Corner) | Performer: Jacopo Salvatori. |
| 9 Sep 2018 | Steve Punt | Scott Joplin | "Solace" | Performer: Alexander Peskanov. |
| 9 Sep 2018 | Steve Punt | Shostakovich | Waltz II (Jazz Suite No. 2) | Orchestra: Amsterdam Concertgebouw Orchestra. Conductor: Riccardo Chailly. |
| 16 Sep 2018 | Bella Hardy | Bella Hardy | Stars | Performer: Bella Hardy. |
| 16 Sep 2018 | Bella Hardy | Puccini | Madame Butterfly (final scene) | Orchestra: La Scala Orchestra, Milan. Conductor: Herbert von Karajan. Singer: Maria Callas. |
| 16 Sep 2018 | Bella Hardy | Gian Piero Reverberi | Magico incontro | Ensemble: Rondò Veneziano. |
| 16 Sep 2018 | Bella Hardy | Alistair Anderson | On Cheviot Hills | Performer: Alistair Anderson. Ensemble: The Lindsays. |
| 16 Sep 2018 | Bella Hardy | Traditional music | "The Wandering Girl" | Singer: Freda Palmer. |
| 16 Sep 2018 | Bella Hardy | Zhou Ziping | Sacred Cloud Music | Performer: Yo-Yo Ma. Ensemble: Silk Road Ensemble. |
| 16 Sep 2018 | Bella Hardy | Debussy | Reverie | Performer: Jean-Efflam Bavouzet. |
| 16 Sep 2018 | Bella Hardy | Philip Stopford | "Lully, Lulla, Lullay" | Choir: Ecclesium Choir. Conductor: Philip Stopford. |
| 30 Sep 2018 | Bel Mooney | Beethoven | String Quartet No. 7 in F major (4th movement: "Thème Russe") | Ensemble: Vlachovo kvarteto Praha |
| 30 Sep 2018 | Bel Mooney | Mozart | Piano Sonata in A major, K. 331 (2nd movement: Menuetto) | Performer: Daniel Barenboim |
| 30 Sep 2018 | Bel Mooney | Giovanni Battista Pergolesi | Stabat Mater (opening) | Orchestra: Les Talens Lyriques. Singer: Barbara Bonney. Singer: Andreas Scholl. |
| 30 Sep 2018 | Bel Mooney | Bach | Partita for Violin No. 3 (1st movement: Preludio) | Performer: Nigel Kennedy |
| 30 Sep 2018 | Bel Mooney | Tony Kinsey | "Tonight I write sadly" | Performer: Christopher Logue. Ensemble: Red Bird Jazz. |
| 30 Sep 2018 | Bel Mooney | Beethoven | Sonata in F major, Op. 24 ("Spring") (1st movemenvt: Allegro) | Performers: Gidon Kremer (violin), Martha Argerich (piano) |
| 30 Sep 2018 | Bel Mooney | Mozart | "Laudate Dominum" (Vesperae solennes de Dominica, K. 321) | Singer: Kiri Te Kanawa, orchestra: London Symphony Orchestra, conductor: Colin Davis |
| 7 Oct 2018 | Ed Vulliamy | Verdi | Triumphal March (Aida) | Orchestra: Philharmonia Orchestra. Conductor: Riccardo Muti. |
| 7 Oct 2018 | Ed Vulliamy | B.B. King | "There Must Be A Better World Somewhere" | Featured Artist: Dr. John |
| 7 Oct 2018 | Ed Vulliamy | Mozart | "Non più andrai" (The Marriage of Figaro) | Orchestra: Philharmonia Orchestra, conductor: Carlo Maria Giulini, singer: Giuseppe Taddei |
| 7 Oct 2018 | Ed Vulliamy | Traditional Macedonian | "Eleno kerko" | Performer: Amira Medunjanin. |
| 7 Oct 2018 | Ed Vulliamy | Shostakovich | Symphony No. 7 (Leningrad) (3rd movement: Adagio) | Orchestra: Czech Philharmonic. Conductor: Karel Ančerl. |
| 7 Oct 2018 | Ed Vulliamy | Schubert | Piano Sonata in G major, D.894 (3rd movemenvt: Menuetto) | Performer: Paul Lewis. |
| 7 Oct 2018 | Ed Vulliamy | Joan Baez | Deportee (Plane wreck at Los Gatos) | Performer: Joan Baez. |
| 14 Oct 2018 | John Bird | Brahms | Academic Festival Overture | Orchestra: New Philhamonia Orchestra. Conductor: John Barbirolli. |
| 14 Oct 2018 | John Bird | Tchaikovsky | "Dance of the Reed Pipes" (The Nutcracker) | Orchestra: Berlin Philharmonic Orchestra. Conductor: Semyon Bychkov. |
| 14 Oct 2018 | John Bird | Grieg | In the Hall of the Mountain King (Peer Gynt) | Orchestra: City of Birmingham Symphony Orchestra. Conductor: Sakari Oramo. |
| 14 Oct 2018 | John Bird | Wagner | Overture: Tannhauser | Orchestra: Bavarian Radio Symphony Orchestra. Conductor: Bernard Haitink. |
| 14 Oct 2018 | John Bird | Mike Westbrook | "I See Thy Form" | Performer: Mike Westbrook. |
| 14 Oct 2018 | John Bird | Steve Reich | The Cave | Ensemble: Steve Reich and Musicians. Conductor: Paul Hillier. |
| 14 Oct 2018 | John Bird | Carl Maria von Weber | Overture: Der Freischütz | Orchestra: London Symphony Orchestra. Conductor: Colin Davis. |
| 21 Oct 2018 | Richard Powers | Bizet | Jeux d'Enfants: La Toupie | Performer: Katia Labèque. Performer: Marielle Labèque. |
| 21 Oct 2018 | Richard Powers | John Dowland | "Time Stands Still" | Performer: Ronn McFarlane. Singer: Julianne Baird. |
| 21 Oct 2018 | Richard Powers | Béla Bartók | String Quartet No. 4 (2nd movement: Prestissimo) | Ensemble: Guarneri Quartet. |
| 21 Oct 2018 | Richard Powers | Mahler | Ich bin der Welt abhanden gekommen (Ruckert-Lieder) | Orchestra: Hallé. Conductor: John Barbirolli. Singer: Janet Baker. |
| 21 Oct 2018 | Richard Powers | Charles Ives | Piano Sonata No. 2 (Concord, Massachusetts) (3rd movement: The Alcotts) | Performer: Gilbert Kalish. |
| 21 Oct 2018 | Richard Powers | Caroline Shaw | Partita for Eight Voices (1st movement: Allemande) | Ensemble: Roomful of Teeth. |
| 21 Oct 2018 | Richard Powers | Bach | Was Gott tut, das ist wohlgetan, BWV 100 | Ensemble: Bach Collegium Japan, conductor: Masaaki Suzuki |
| 21 Oct 2018 | Richard Powers | Traditional music | "The Parting Glass" | Ensemble: The Wailin' Jennys. |
| 4 Nov 2018 | Anil Seth | Chopin | Prelude in D♭ major ("Raindrop") | Performer: Alexandre Tharaud. |
| 4 Nov 2018 | Anil Seth | Bach | Magnificat in D major | Conductor: Stephen Cleobury, singer: Susan Gritton |
| 4 Nov 2018 | Anil Seth | Vivaldi | Concerto in B♭ major for violin and strings (2nd movement: Andante) | Performer: Giacomo Agazzini. Performer: Ezio Bosso. Orchestra: Orquesta sinfónica de Madrid. |
| 4 Nov 2018 | Anil Seth | Walter Donaldson | "Love me or leave me" | Singer: Nina Simone. |
| 4 Nov 2018 | Anil Seth | Billy Taylor | "I wish I knew (how it would feel to be free)" | km_ Dick Dallas. Ensemble: Billy Taylor Trio. |
| 4 Nov 2018 | Anil Seth | Enrique Granados | Spanish Dance No. 5 | Performer: John Williams. |
| 4 Nov 2018 | Anil Seth | Traditional Indian | "Gayati Mantra" | Performer: Anuradha Paudwal. |
| 4 Nov 2018 | Anil Seth | Lin-Manuel Miranda | "Alexander Hamilton" (Hamilton) | Performer: Lin-Manuel Miranda. Performer: Renée Elise Goldsberry. Performer: Alex Lacamoire. |
| 11 Nov 2018 | Margaret MacMillan | Ravel | La valse | Orchestra: Rotterdam Philharmonic Orchestra, conductor: Yannick Nézet-Séguin |
| 11 Nov 2018 | Margaret MacMillan | Traditional Welsh | "Men of Harlech" | Choir: Froncysyllte Male Voice Choir, conductor: Ann Atkinson |
| 11 Nov 2018 | Margaret MacMillan | Traditional Scottish | "The Road to the Isles" | Singer: Andy Stewart |
| 11 Nov 2018 | Margaret MacMillan | Richard Strauss | Metamorphosen | Orchestra: Norwegian Chamber Orchestra, conductor: Iona Brown |
| 11 Nov 2018 | Margaret MacMillan | Puccini | "Signore, ascolta!" (from Turandot) | Orchestra: London Philharmonic Orchestra, conductor: Zubin Mehta, singer: Montserrat Caballé |
| 11 Nov 2018 | Margaret MacMillan | Michael Tippett | "Steal Away" (as used in A Child of Our Time) | Orchestra: City of Birmingham Symphony Orchestra, conductor: Michael Tippett, singers: Faye Robinson (soprano), Jon Garrison (tenor), CBSO Chorus |
| 25 Nov 2018 | Rebecca Stott | Paul Simon | "American Tune" | Performer: Paul Simon. |
| 25 Nov 2018 | Rebecca Stott | Rachmaninoff | Vocalise, Op. 34, No. 14 | Performer: Maxim Vengerov. Ensemble: Virtuosi. |
| 25 Nov 2018 | Rebecca Stott | Traditional music | "Wayfaring Stranger" | Singer: Andreas Scholl. |
| 25 Nov 2018 | Rebecca Stott | Giovanni Battista Pergolesi | Stabat Mater | Singer: Emma Kirkby. Singer: James Bowman. Ensemble: Academy of Ancient Music. Conductor: Christopher Hogwood. |
| 25 Nov 2018 | Rebecca Stott | Traditional music | "Sha, Sha, Di Shviger Kumt" | Ensemble: Chicago Klezmer Ensemble. |
| 25 Nov 2018 | Rebecca Stott | Mozart | Piano Concerto No. 21 in C major, K. 467 (2nd movement: Andante) | Performer: Géza Anda, ensemble: Camerata Salzburg |
| 25 Nov 2018 | Rebecca Stott | Leonard Cohen | "Suzanne" | Performer: Leonard Cohen. |
| 2 Dec 2018 | David Rieff | Orlande de Lassus | "Vide homo" (Lagrime di San Pietro) | Choir: Gallicantus. Conductor: Gabriel Crouch. |
| 2 Dec 2018 | David Rieff | Henry Purcell | "Come Ye Sons of Art" | Singer: Alfred Deller. Singer: John Whitworth. Conductor: Anthony Lewis. |
| 2 Dec 2018 | David Rieff | Shostakovich | Passacaglia (Lady Macbeth of Mtsensk) | Performer: Matthias Havinga. |
| 2 Dec 2018 | David Rieff | Traditional Scottish | "Mo Ghile Mear" (My Dashing Darling) | Performer: Iarla Ó Lionáird. Performer: Mary Black. Performer: Mary Ann Kennedy. |
| 2 Dec 2018 | David Rieff | Bach | Ich habe genug, BWV 82 | Singer: Lorraine Hunt Lieberson, orchestra: Emmanuel Music, conductor: Craig Smith |
| 2 Dec 2018 | David Rieff | Beethoven | String Quartet in A minor, Op. 132 (3rd movement: "Heiliger Dankgesang") | Ensemble: Belcea Quartet |
| 2 Dec 2018 | David Rieff | Traditional music | "Shady Grove" | Performer: Tony Rice. Performer: Peter Rowan. |
| 16 Dec 2018 | Daniel Evans | Stephen Sondheim | "Too Many Mornings" (Follies) | Orchestra: New York Philharmonic. Conductor: Paul Gemignani. Singer: Barbara Cook. Singer: George Hearn. |
| 16 Dec 2018 | Daniel Evans | Leonard Bernstein | Candide – Overture | Orchestra: London Symphony Orchestra, conductor: Leonard Bernstein |
| 16 Dec 2018 | Daniel Evans | Britten | "Now the Great Bear and the Pleaides" (from Peter Grimes) | Orchestra: Orchestra of the Royal Opera House, Covent Garden; conductor: Colin Davis; singer: Jon Vickers |
| 16 Dec 2018 | Daniel Evans | Donizetti | "Ah! Mes Amis" (La Fille du Regiment) | Orchestra: Giuseppe Verdi Orchestra of Milan. Conductor: Riccardo Frizza. Singer: Juan Diego Flórez. |
| 16 Dec 2018 | Daniel Evans | Beethoven | Piano Sonata No. 8 in C minor ("Pathétique") (1st movement) | Performer: Daniel Barenboim |
| 16 Dec 2018 | Daniel Evans | Traditional Welsh | "Ar Hyd y Nos" | Orchestra: Welsh National Opera Orchestra. Conductor: Gareth Jones. Singer: Bryn Terfel. |
| 23 Dec 2018 | Jan Ravens | Camille Saint-Saëns | "Mon coeur s'ouvre" (Samson et Delilah) | Orchestra: Paris Conservatoire Orchestra. Conductor: Georges Prêtre. Singer: Maria Callas. |
| 23 Dec 2018 | Jan Ravens | Gluck | "What is Life?" (Orfeo ed Euridice) | Orchestra: London Symphony Orchestra. Conductor: Malcolm Sargent. Singer: Kathleen Ferrier. |
| 23 Dec 2018 | Jan Ravens | Bruce Springsteen & The E Street Band | Born To Run | |
| 23 Dec 2018 | Jan Ravens | Bach | St Matthew Passion (opening) | Orchestra: Concentus Musicus Wien, conductor: Nikolaus Harnoncourt, choir: Arnold Schoenberg Chor |
| 23 Dec 2018 | Jan Ravens | Vivaldi | The Four Seasons Recomposed | km_ Max Richter. Performer: Daniel Hope. Orchestra: Berlin Konzerthaus Orchestra. Conductor: André de Ridder. |
| 23 Dec 2018 | Jan Ravens | Wagner | "Mild und Leise..." (Tristan und Isolde) | Orchestra: London Philharmonic Orchestra. Conductor: Klaus Tennstedt. Singer: Jessye Norman. |
| 23 Dec 2018 | Jan Ravens | Leonard Bernstein | "Make our Garden grow" (Candide) | Ensemble: Original Broadcast Cast. |

== 2019 ==
| Date | Guest | Composer | Title | Performer |
|---|---|---|---|---|
| 6 Jan 2019 | Clarke Peters | Joan Armatrading | "Love and Affection" | Singer: Joan Armatrading |
| 6 Jan 2019 | Clarke Peters | Louis Moreau Gottschalk | Bamboula, Op. 2 | Performer: Roger Lord |
| 6 Jan 2019 | Clarke Peters | George Gershwin | Rhapsody in Blue | Performer: Freddy Kempf, orchestra: Bergen Philharmonic Orchestra, conductor: Andrew Litton |
| 6 Jan 2019 | Clarke Peters | Heitor Villa-Lobos | Prelude No. 1 | Performer: Eduardo Fernández |
| 6 Jan 2019 | Clarke Peters | Ravel | "Lever du jour" (from part 3 of Daphnis et Chloé) | Orchestra: Rotterdam Philharmonic Orchestra, conductor: Yannick Nézet-Séguin |
| 6 Jan 2019 | Clarke Peters | Debussy | La Mer | Orchestra: The Hallé, conductor: Sir Mark Elder |
| 6 Jan 2019 | Clarke Peters | Rachmaninoff | Prelude in C♯ minor | Performers: Nat King Cole (piano), Oscar Moore (guitar), Johnny Miller (bass) |
| 13 Jan 2019 | Sigrid Rausing | Schubert | Standchen (Schwanengesang) | Performer: Vladimir Horowitz. Music Arranger: Franz Liszt. |
| 13 Jan 2019 | Sigrid Rausing | Mozart | Clarinet Concerto in A major, K. 622 (2nd movement: Adagio) | Performer: Martin Fröst, orchestra: Deutsche Kammerphilharmonie Bremen |
| 13 Jan 2019 | Sigrid Rausing | Thorstein Bergman | Spelmannen | Performer: Thorstein Bergman. |
| 13 Jan 2019 | Sigrid Rausing | Felix Mendelssohn | Song without Words, Op. 109 | Performer: Mischa Maisky. Performer: Sergio Tiempo. |
| 13 Jan 2019 | Sigrid Rausing | Brahms | Variations and Fugue on a theme of Handel | Performer: Murray Perahia. |
| 13 Jan 2019 | Sigrid Rausing | Cole Porter | "Anything Goes" | Performer: Ella Fitzgerald. |
| 13 Jan 2019 | Sigrid Rausing | Beethoven | "Ode to Joy" (Symphony No. 9) | Performer: Igor Levit (piano), arrangement: Franz Liszt |
| 20 Jan 2019 | Tim Firth | Tomaso Giovanni Albinoni | Concerto in F major for 2 oboes and strings, Op. 9, No. 3 (1st movement: Allegro) | Performer: Catherine Latham. Performer: Anthony Robson. Orchestra: Collegium Musicum 90. Conductor: Simon Standage. |
| 20 Jan 2019 | Tim Firth | Bach | Violin Concerto in E major, BWV 1042 (1st movement: Allegro) | Performer: Renaud Capuçon, orchestra: Chamber Orchestra of Europe |
| 20 Jan 2019 | Tim Firth | Frederick Delius | 2 Aquarelles for string orchestra, arr. Fenby...: No. 2; Gaily, but not too quick | Eric Fenby. Orchestra: English Chamber Orchestra. Conductor: Daniel Barenboim. Orchestrator: Deutsche Gramophon |
| 20 Jan 2019 | Tim Firth | Aaron Copland | "Dance of the Adolescent" (Grohg) | Orchestra: Bournemouth Symphony Orchestra. Conductor: Marin Alsop. |
| 20 Jan 2019 | Tim Firth | Henryk Mikolaj Górecki | Symphony No. 3 (Symphony of Sorrowful Songs) (excerpt) | Orchestra: London Sinfonietta. Conductor: David Zinman. Singer: Dawn Upshaw. |
| 20 Jan 2019 | Tim Firth | Ligeti | "Six Bagatelles for Wind Quintet" (No. 1: Allegro con spirito) | Ensemble: Claude Debussy Wind Quintet. |
| 27 Jan 2019 | Lisa Appignanesi | Monteverdi | "Possente spirto" (L'Orfeo) | Ensemble: I Barrochisti. Conductor: Diego Fasolis. Singer: Philippe Jaroussky. |
| 27 Jan 2019 | Lisa Appignanesi | Mozart | "Voi che sapete" (The Marriage of Figaro) | Orchestra: Vienna Philharmonic, conductor: Claudio Abbado, singer: Cecilia Bartoli |
| 27 Jan 2019 | Lisa Appignanesi | Debussy | Premiere Rhapsodie | Performer: James Campbell. Performer: Glenn Gould. |
| 27 Jan 2019 | Lisa Appignanesi | Kurt Weill | "Surabaya Johnny" | Singer: Lotte Lenya. |
| 27 Jan 2019 | Lisa Appignanesi | Jimmy Cox | "Nobody knows when you're down and out" | Singer: Bessie Smith. |
| 27 Jan 2019 | Lisa Appignanesi | Laurie Anderson | "O Superman" | Performer: Laurie Anderson. |
| 27 Jan 2019 | Lisa Appignanesi | Sergei Prokofiev | Peter and the Wolf | Ensemble: Nash Ensemble. Conductor: Libor Pešek. Narrator: Lenny Henry. |
| 3 Feb 2019 | Oliver Ford Davies | Haydn | String Quartet in B♭, Op. 50, no. 1 (Finale) | Ensemble: Lindsay String Quartet. |
| 3 Feb 2019 | Oliver Ford Davies | Stravinsky | Petrushka (excerpt) | Performer: City of Birmingham Symphony Orchestra. Conductor: Sir Simon Rattle. |
| 3 Feb 2019 | Oliver Ford Davies | Elgar | Piano Quintet in A minor, Op. 84 (2nd movement: Adagio) | Performer: Piers Lane. Ensemble: Vellinger Quartet. |
| 3 Feb 2019 | Oliver Ford Davies | Alban Berg | Violin Concerto (2nd movement: Adagio) | Performer: Isabelle Faust. Orchestra: Orchestra Mozart. Conductor: Claudio Abbado. |
| 3 Feb 2019 | Oliver Ford Davies | Ralph Vaughan Williams | Linden Lea | Performer: Tim Laycock. |
| 3 Feb 2019 | Oliver Ford Davies | Mozart | The Marriage of Figaro (act 4, finale) | Orchestra: Vienna Symphony, conductor: Karl Böhm, singer: Elisabeth Schwarzkopf |
| 10 Feb 2019 | Preti Taneja | Traditional music | "Abhi to main jawan hoon" | Performer: Malika Pukhraj,. |
| 10 Feb 2019 | Preti Taneja | Vivaldi | "Nulla in mundo pax sincera" | Ensemble: Academy of Ancient Music. Director: Christopher Hogwood. Singer: Emma Kirkby. |
| 10 Feb 2019 | Preti Taneja | Ilham al-Madfai | Baghdad | Performer: Ilham al-Madfai. |
| 10 Feb 2019 | Preti Taneja | Zakir Hussain | Raga Chandrakauns | Performer: Hariprasad Chaurasia. Performer: Zakir Hussain. |
| 10 Feb 2019 | Preti Taneja | Shostakovich | King Lear (Prelude and Song of Cordelia) | Orchestra: Berlin Radio Symphony Orchestra. Conductor: Michail Jurowski. |
| 10 Feb 2019 | Preti Taneja | Philip Glass | Why Does Somebody Have to Die? (The Hours) | Orchestra: Studio Orchestra. Conductor: Philip Glass. |
| 10 Feb 2019 | Preti Taneja | Nusrat Fateh Ali Khan | Hamd (Louange a Dieu) | Performer: Nusrat Fateh Ali Khan. |
| 24 Feb 2019 | Julian Baggini | Ravel | Violin Sonata in G (2nd movement: Blues) | Performers: Jean-Jacques Kantorow (violin), Jacques Rouvier (piano) |
| 24 Feb 2019 | Julian Baggini | Brahms | Symphony No. 4 in E minor (2nd movement: Andante moderato) | Orchestra: Scottish Chamber Orchestra, conductor: Robin Ticciati |
| 24 Feb 2019 | Julian Baggini | Karol Szymanowski | Mazurka No. 12 | Performer: Marc-André Hamelin |
| 24 Feb 2019 | Julian Baggini | Michael Nyman | String Quartet No. 2 (1st movement) | Performer: Balanescu Quartet |
| 24 Feb 2019 | Julian Baggini | Jessica Curry | "Always (Hebridean Mix)" | Performer: Jessica Curry |
| 24 Feb 2019 | Julian Baggini | Mark Hollis and Tim Friese-Greene | "The Rainbow" from the album Spirit of Eden | Ensemble: Talk Talk |
| 24 Feb 2019 | Julian Baggini | Antonín Dvořák | Serenade for Strings in E major (1st movement) | Orchestra: Philharmonia Orchestra, conductor: Christopher Warren-Green |
| 3 Mar 2019 | Rachel Parris | Rachel Parris | "Don't Take my Advice" | Performer: Rachel Parris. |
| 3 Mar 2019 | Rachel Parris | Tom Lehrer | "Poisoning Pigeons in the Park" | Performer: Tom Lehrer. |
| 3 Mar 2019 | Rachel Parris | Nikolai Rimsky-Korsakov | "The Sea and Sinbad's Ship" (Scheherazade) | Performer: Michel Schwalbé. Orchestra: Berlin Philharmonic Orchestra. Conductor: Herbert von Karajan. |
| 3 Mar 2019 | Rachel Parris | Thomas Tallis | Te lucis ante terminum | Choir: Magdala Choir. Conductor: David Skinner. |
| 3 Mar 2019 | Rachel Parris | Leonard Bernstein | "The Dance at the Gym" (West Side Story) | Performer: Members of the Cast. |
| 3 Mar 2019 | Rachel Parris | Ralph Vaughan Williams | Serenade to Music | Orchestra: English Chamber Orchestra. Conductor: Matthew Best. |
| 3 Mar 2019 | Rachel Parris | Debussy | Arabesque No. 1 | Performer: Jacques Rouvier. |
| 3 Mar 2019 | Rachel Parris | Cole Porter | "My Heart Belongs to Daddy" | Performer: Oscar Peterson. |
| 10 Mar 2019 | Greta Scacchi | Handel | "Ombra mai fu" (from Serse) | Orchestra: Orchestra of the Age of Enlightenment, conductor: Sir Roger Norrington, singer: Andreas Scholl |
| 10 Mar 2019 | Greta Scacchi | Maria Cosway | Mormora | Performer: Mary Nichols. Performer: Jan Walters. |
| 10 Mar 2019 | Greta Scacchi | Erik Satie | Gnossienne No. 1 | Performer: Lang Lang. |
| 10 Mar 2019 | Greta Scacchi | Vivian Ellis | "I'm on a See-Saw" | Performer: Fats Waller. |
| 10 Mar 2019 | Greta Scacchi | Jimmy Giuffre | "Gotta Dance" | Ensemble: The Jimmy Giuffre Trio. |
| 10 Mar 2019 | Greta Scacchi | Richard Robbins | To the Monastery/End Titles (Heat and Dust) | Performer: Nishat Khan. |
| 10 Mar 2019 | Greta Scacchi | Bach | Toccata in C minor, BWV 911 | Performer: Martha Argerich |
| 10 Mar 2019 | Greta Scacchi | Joseph Canteloube | Bailero (Songs of the Auvergne) | Singer: Frederica von Stade. |
| 17 Mar 2019 | Mark Morris | Germaine Tailleferre | Fandango | Performer: Marc Clinton. Performer: Nicole Narboni. |
| 17 Mar 2019 | Mark Morris | Lou Harrison | Largo Ostinato | Performer: Linda Birman-Hall. |
| 17 Mar 2019 | Mark Morris | Lou Harrison | Symphony No. 3 (4th movement: Largo Ostinato) | Orchestra: Cabrillo Music Festival Orchestra. Conductor: Dennis Russell Davies. |
| 17 Mar 2019 | Mark Morris | Handel | "Beato in ver chi può" (Italian Duet No. 18, HWV 181) | Singers: Mária Zádori (soprano), Paul Esswood (countertenor) |
| 17 Mar 2019 | Mark Morris | Domenico Scarlatti | Sonata in G major, Kk2 | Performer: Vojtech Spurny. |
| 17 Mar 2019 | Mark Morris | Domenico Scarlatti | Sonata in G major, Kk391 | Performer: Michelangelo Carbonara. |
| 17 Mar 2019 | Mark Morris | Domenico Scarlatti | Sonata in A major, Kk208 | Performer: Alexandre Tharaud. |
| 17 Mar 2019 | Mark Morris | Erik Satie | Perpetual Tango (Sports et Divertissements) | Performer: Jean-Yves Thibaudet. |
| 31 Mar 2019 | Uta Frith | Bedřich Smetana | The Moldau (Ma Vlast) | Orchestra: Polish National Radio Symphony Orchestra. Conductor: Antoni Wit. |
| 31 Mar 2019 | Uta Frith | Jacques Offenbach | "Les Oiseaux dans la Charmille" (Les Contes d'Hoffmann) | Singer: Joan Sutherland. |
| 31 Mar 2019 | Uta Frith | Fred Frith | From the Backstretch | Performer: Fred Frith. |
| 31 Mar 2019 | Uta Frith | Beethoven | Overture: Fidelio | Leipzig Gewandhaus Orchestra, conductor: Riccardo Chailly |
| 31 Mar 2019 | Uta Frith | Hildegard von Bingen | "O Jerusalem" | Choir: Gothic Voices. Conductor: Christopher Page. |
| 31 Mar 2019 | Uta Frith | Clara Schumann | Piano Trio in G minor, Op. 17 (1st movement: Andante) | Performers: Antje Weithaas, Tanja Tetzlaff, Gunilla Süssmann |
| 31 Mar 2019 | Uta Frith | Friedrich Hollaender | Raus mit den Mannern! | Singer: Ute Lemper. |
| 7 Apr 2019 | Jo Brand | Bach | Toccata and Fugue in D minor, BWV 565 | Performer: Harold Britton |
| 7 Apr 2019 | Jo Brand | Felix Mendelssohn | Violin Concerto in E minor, Op. 64 (1st movement) | Performer: Anne-Sophie Mutter. Orchestra: Berlin Philharmonic Orchestra. Conductor: Herbert von Karajan. |
| 7 Apr 2019 | Jo Brand | Michael Nyman | "Chasing Sheep is Best Left to Shepherds" (The Draughtsman's Contract) | Ensemble: Michael Nyman Band. |
| 7 Apr 2019 | Jo Brand | Brahms | Variations on a Theme by Haydn, Op. 56a | Orchestra: Royal Concertgebouw Orchestra. Conductor: Bernard Haitink. |
| 7 Apr 2019 | Jo Brand | Carl Orff | "O Fortuna" (Carmina Burana) | Orchestra: Bournemouth Symphony Orchestra. Conductor: Marin Alsop. Choir: Bournemouth Symphony Chorus. |
| 7 Apr 2019 | Jo Brand | Beethoven | Symphony No. 6 ("Pastorale") (excerpt) | London Symphony Orchestra, conductor: Wyn Morris |
| 7 Apr 2019 | Jo Brand | Holst | Jupiter – The Bringer of Jollity (4th movement from The Planets) | Orchestra: London Philharmonic Orchestra, conductor: Vladimir Jurowski |
| 14 Apr 2019 | Roger Kneebone | François Couperin | Les Idées Heureuses | Performer: Sophie Yates. |
| 14 Apr 2019 | Roger Kneebone | Bach | Concerto for 2 Violins in D minor (2nd movement: Largo) | Performers: Rachel Podger, Bojan Čičić, ensemble: Brecon Baroque |
| 14 Apr 2019 | Roger Kneebone | Charles Lloyd | Dancing Water, Big Sur to Bahia | Performer: Charles Lloyd. |
| 14 Apr 2019 | Roger Kneebone | Pete Atkin | Secret Drinker | Performer: Pete Atkin. |
| 14 Apr 2019 | Roger Kneebone | Schubert | String Quintet in C major, D.956 | Ensemble: Amsterdam Sinfonietta. |
| 14 Apr 2019 | Roger Kneebone | Handel | "As steals the morn" (from L'Allegro, il Penseroso ed il Moderato) | Singers: Lucy Crowe (soprano), Mark Padmore (tenor), The English Concert, conductor: Andrew Manze |
| 28 Apr 2019 | David Wilson | Jimmy McHugh | "Let's Get Lost" | Performer: Chet Baker. |
| 28 Apr 2019 | David Wilson | Jean Sibelius | Andante Festivo | Orchestra: Oslo Philharmonic Orchestra. |
| 28 Apr 2019 | David Wilson | Leonard Bernstein | "America" (West Side Story) | Performer: Unknown. |
| 28 Apr 2019 | David Wilson | Aaron Copland | Appalachian Spring | Orchestra: San Francisco Symphony. Conductor: Michael Tilson Thomas. |
| 28 Apr 2019 | David Wilson | Schubert | String Quartet (Death and the Maiden (4th movement: Presto) | Ensemble: Takács Quartet. |
| 28 Apr 2019 | David Wilson | Bach | "Aria" (Goldberg Variations, BWV 988) | Performer: Glenn Gould |
| 28 Apr 2019 | David Wilson | Craig Armstrong | Glasgow Love Theme (Love Actually) | Performer: Unknown. |
| 5 May 2019 | Barbara Hosking | Malcolm Arnold | The Padstow Lifeboat | Performer: Grimethorpe Colliery Band. |
| 5 May 2019 | Barbara Hosking | Camille Saint-Saëns | "L'amour viens aider ma faiblesse" (Samson et Dalila) | Orchestra: La Scala Orchestra, Milan. Conductor: Georges Prêtre. Singer: Shirley Verrett. |
| 5 May 2019 | Barbara Hosking | Jacob Jacobs | "Bei mir bistu shein" | Ensemble: Budapest Klezmer Band. |
| 5 May 2019 | Barbara Hosking | Richard Strauss | "Grossmächtige Prinzessin} (Ariadne auf Naxos) | Orchestra: Gewandhausorchester Leipzig. Conductor: Kurt Masur. Singer: Edita Gruberová. |
| 5 May 2019 | Barbara Hosking | Elgar | Cockaigne Overture | Orchestra: London Symphony Orchestra. Conductor: Edward Heath. |
| 5 May 2019 | Barbara Hosking | Schubert | Der Leiermann (Winterreise) | Performer: Anna Tilbrook. Singer: James Gilchrist. |
| 5 May 2019 | Barbara Hosking | Britten | Epilogue (Billy Budd) | Orchestra: London Symphony Orchestra. Conductor: Richard Hickox. Singer: Philip Langridge. |
| 19 May 2019 | Jess Robinson | Alex Silverman | "It Must be Love" | Performer: Jess Robinson. |
| 19 May 2019 | Jess Robinson | Samuel Barber | Sure on this Shining Night | Choir: Cambridge University Chamber Choir. Conductor: Timothy Brown. |
| 19 May 2019 | Jess Robinson | Gordon Young | Prelude in Classic Style | Performer: Simon Lindley. |
| 19 May 2019 | Jess Robinson | Traditional Yiddish | Traditional Yiddish Song | Performer: Rosi Schul. Performer: Jules Ruben. |
| 19 May 2019 | Jess Robinson | Ralph Vaughan Williams | Fantasia on a Theme by Thomas Tallis | Orchestra: Royal Philharmonic Orchestra. Conductor: Sir Charles Groves. |
| 19 May 2019 | Jess Robinson | Roger Ramirez | "Lover Man" | Performer: Billie Holiday. |
| 19 May 2019 | Jess Robinson | Debussy | Salut Printemps (Le Printemps) | Choir: Toronto Children's Chorus. Singer: Jean Ashworth Bartle. |
| 19 May 2019 | Jess Robinson | Gabriel Fauré | "Sanctus; Pie Jesu" (Requiem) | Orchestra: Orchestre national de France. Conductor: Laurence Equilbey. Singer: Sandrine Piau. Choir: Accentus. |
| 2 Jun 2019 | Robert Icke | Chopin | Ballade No. 1 in G minor, Op. 23 | Performer: Vladimir Horowitz. |
| 2 Jun 2019 | Robert Icke | François Couperin | Les Barricades Mystérieuses | Performer: Iddo Bar-Shaï. |
| 2 Jun 2019 | Robert Icke | Brian Wilson | "God Only Knows" | Ensemble: The Beach Boys. |
| 2 Jun 2019 | Robert Icke | Richard Rodgers | "Little Girl Blue" | Performer: Nina Simone. |
| 2 Jun 2019 | Robert Icke | Pérotin | "Viderunt Omnes" | Choir: The Hilliard Ensemble. |
| 2 Jun 2019 | Robert Icke | Bob Dylan | "Not Dark Yet" | Performer: Bob Dylan. |
| 2 Jun 2019 | Robert Icke | Monteverdi | "Pur ti miro" (L'Incoronazione di Poppea) | Ensemble: L'Arpeggiata. Conductor: Christina Pluhar. Singer: Núria Rial. Singer: Philippe Jaroussky. |
| 2 Jun 2019 | Robert Icke | Laura Marling | "How Can I" | Performer: Laura Marling. |
| 9 Jun 2019 | Lucasta Miller | Carl Maria von Weber | Wolf's Glen Scene (Der Freischütz, act 2) | Orchestra: Staatskapelle Dresden. Conductor: Carlos Kleiber. Singer: Theo Adam. |
| 9 Jun 2019 | Lucasta Miller | Vincenzo Bellini | Casta Diva (Norma, act 1) | Orchestra: La Scala Orchestra, Milan. Conductor: Tullio Serafin. Singer: Maria Callas. |
| 9 Jun 2019 | Lucasta Miller | Monteverdi | Il Ritorno d'Ulisse (Final Scene) | Orchestra: Concentus Musicus Wien. Conductor: Nikolaus Harnoncourt. Singer: Sven Olof Eliasson. Singer: Norma Lerer. |
| 9 Jun 2019 | Lucasta Miller | Clara Schumann | "Liebst du um Schönheit" (Op. 12, No. 2) | Singer: Barbara Bonney, performer: Vladimir Ashkenazy |
| 9 Jun 2019 | Lucasta Miller | Bach | Prelude (Cello Suite No. 1 in G major, BWV 1007) | Performer: Steven Isserlis |
| 9 Jun 2019 | Lucasta Miller | Hans Werner Henze | Das Paradies (6 Songs from the Arabian) | Performer: Julius Drake. Singer: Ian Bostridge. |
| 16 Jun 2019 | June Spencer | Max Bruch | Violin Concerto No. 1 in G minor (2nd movement: Adagio) | Performer: Chloë Hanslip. Orchestra: London Symphony Orchestra. Conductor: Martyn Brabbins. |
| 16 Jun 2019 | June Spencer | Rachmaninoff | Piano Concerto No. 2 in C minor (3rd movement: Allegro) | Performer: Yuja Wang. Orchestra: Mahler Chamber Orchestra. Conductor: Claudio Abbado. |
| 16 Jun 2019 | June Spencer | Vivaldi | "Winter" (The Four Seasons) | Orchestra: Taverner Players. Conductor: Andrew Parrott. |
| 16 Jun 2019 | June Spencer | Felix Mendelssohn | Overture: A Midsummer Night's Dream | Orchestra: Rotterdam Philharmonic Orchestra. Conductor: Jeffrey Tate. |
| 16 Jun 2019 | June Spencer | Puccini | "O Soave Fanciulla" (La Bohème) | Orchestra: Berlin Philharmonic Orchestra. Conductor: Herbert von Karajan. Singer: Mirella Freni. Singer: Luciano Pavarotti. |
| 16 Jun 2019 | June Spencer | John Lennon And Paul Mccartney | "Yesterday" | km_ Paul McCartney. Performer: Plácido Domingo. |
| 16 Jun 2019 | June Spencer | Rossini | "Duetto buffo di due gatti" | Singer: Felicity Lott. Singer: Ann Murray. |
| 30 Jun 2019 | Harry Enfield | Verdi | Partite? Crudele... (Rigoletto, act 1) | Orchestra: Metropolitan Opera Orchestra. Conductor: James Levine. |
| 30 Jun 2019 | Harry Enfield | Verdi | Harry Enfield and Chums – Signature Tune arr. from Verdi's Rigoletto | Music arranger: Julia St. John |
| 30 Jun 2019 | Harry Enfield | Verdi | Soldiers' Chorus (Il trovatore) | Orchestra: La Scala Milan Chorus & Orchestra, conductor: Riccardo Muti |
| 30 Jun 2019 | Harry Enfield | Elgar | Violin Concerto in B minor, Op. 61 (3rd movement: Allegro molto) | Performer: Yehudi Menuhin. Orchestra: London Symphony Orchestra. Conductor: Edward Elgar. |
| 30 Jun 2019 | Harry Enfield | Schubert | Piano Sonata in A minor, D.845 (1st movement: Moderato) | Performer: Alfred Brendel. |
| 30 Jun 2019 | Harry Enfield | Rossini | Largo al Factotum (Il Barbiere di Siviglia) | Orchestra: Academy of St Martin in the Fields. Conductor: Neville Marriner. Singer: Thomas Allen. |
| 30 Jun 2019 | Harry Enfield | Samuel Barber | Adagio for Strings | Orchestra: Bergen Philharmonic Orchestra. Conductor: Andrew Litton. |
| 30 Jun 2019 | Harry Enfield | Paul Oakenfold | "Another Day" | Orchestra: NBC Symphony Orchestra. Conductor: Arturo Toscanini. Ensemble: Skip Raiders. Featured Artist: Jada. |
| 30 Jun 2019 | Harry Enfield | Mozart | "Queen of the Night aria" (The Magic Flute) | Singer: Florence Foster Jenkins |
| 30 Jun 2019 | Harry Enfield | Modest Mussorgsky | Boris Godunov (act 1, excerpt) | Orchestra: Orchestra of Opera North. Conductor: Paul Daniel. Singer: John Tomlinson. |
| 7 Jul 2019 | Sarah Langford (Worldcat) | Bach | Prelude (Cello Suite No. 1, BWV 1007) | Performer: Peter Gregson, arrangement: Peter Gregson |
| 7 Jul 2019 | Sarah Langford (Worldcat) | Witold Lutosławski | Symphony No. 4 (excerpt) | Orchestra: Los Angeles Philharmonic. Conductor: Esa-Pekka Salonen. |
| 7 Jul 2019 | Sarah Langford (Worldcat) | Paul Dukas | The Sorcerer's Apprentice | Orchestra: Philharmonia Orchestra. Conductor: James Levine. |
| 7 Jul 2019 | Sarah Langford (Worldcat) | Messiaen | "Louange à l'Éternité de Jésus" (Praise to the Eternity of Jesus) (from Quartet for the End of Time) | Performers: Benjamin Hughes (cello)VIAF 13164600579237672315, Kathron Sturrock (piano) |
| 7 Jul 2019 | Sarah Langford (Worldcat) | Morten Lauridsen | O Magnum Mysterium | Choir: New College Oxford Choir. Conductor: Edward Higginbottom. |
| 7 Jul 2019 | Sarah Langford (Worldcat) | Parov Stelar | "Clap Your Hands" | Performer: Parov Stelar. |
| 14 Jul 2019 | James Burke | Mozart | Clarinet Quintet, K. 581 (2nd movement: Larghetto) | Performer: Jörg Widmann, ensemble: Arcanto Quartett |
| 14 Jul 2019 | James Burke | Traditional Italian | "I' te vurria vasà" | Singer: Miranda Martino. |
| 14 Jul 2019 | James Burke | Aaron Copland | Fanfare for the Common Man | Orchestra: New York Philharmonic. Conductor: Leonard Bernstein. |
| 14 Jul 2019 | James Burke | Joseph Canteloube | Bailero (Chants d'Auvergne) | Orchestra: Royal Philharmonic Orchestra. Conductor: Antonio de Almeida. Singer: Frederica von Stade. |
| 14 Jul 2019 | James Burke | Isaac Albéniz | Asturias | Performer: Andrés Segovia. |
| 14 Jul 2019 | James Burke | Mozart | "Soave sia il vento" (Così fan tutte) | Orchestra: Academy of St Martin in the Fields, conductor: Neville Marriner, singers: Karita Mattila, Anne Sofie von Otter, Thomas Allen |
| 14 Jul 2019 | James Burke | Handel | "Sound an alarm" (from Judas Maccabaeus) | Orchestra: London Symphony Orchestra, conductor: Malcolm Sargent, singer: Richard Lewis |
| 28 Jul 2019 | Peter Piot | Leonora Duarte | Sinfonia de decimi toni | Ensemble: Transports public. Conductor: Thomas Baeté. |
| 28 Jul 2019 | Peter Piot | Bach | "Kommt, ihr Töchter" (St Matthew Passion) | Ensemble: Collegium Vocale Ghent chorus & orchestra, conductor: Philippe Herreweghe |
| 28 Jul 2019 | Peter Piot | Anonymous work | Si Naani | Performer: Toumani Diabaté. |
| 28 Jul 2019 | Peter Piot | Gluck | "Che faro senza Euridice" (Orfeo ed Euridice) | Orchestra: Southern Philharmonic Orchestra. Conductor: Fritz Stiedry. Singer: Kathleen Ferrier. |
| 28 Jul 2019 | Peter Piot | Mozart | "Der Hölle Rache" (The Magic Flute) | Ensemble: Akademie für Alte Musik Berlin, conductor: René Jacobs, singer: Anna-Kristiina Kaappola |
| 28 Jul 2019 | Peter Piot | Umberto Giordano | La Mamma Morta (Andrea Chenier) | Orchestra: Philharmonia Orchestra. Conductor: Tullio Serafin. Singer: Maria Callas. |
| 28 Jul 2019 | Peter Piot | Papa Wemba | "Mi Amor" | Performer: Papa Wemba. |
| 18 Aug 2019 | Hannah Sullivan | Richard Strauss | Act 3: "Marie Theres'!" (Der Rosenkavalier) | Singers: Christa Ludwig, Elisabeth Schwarzkopf, Teresa Stich-Randall. Orchestra: Philharmonia Orchestra. Conductor: Herbert von Karajan. |
| 18 Aug 2019 | Hannah Sullivan | Bach | Cello Suite No. 5, BWV 1011 (Prelude) | Performer: Edgar Meyer (double bass) |
| 18 Aug 2019 | Hannah Sullivan | Amy Winehouse | "You Know I'm No Good" | Featured Artist: Ghostface Killah |
| 18 Aug 2019 | Hannah Sullivan | Antonín Dvořák | Cello Concerto in B minor (1st movement: Allegro) | Performer: Jacqueline du Pré, orchestra: Chicago Symphony Orchestra, conductor: Daniel Barenboim |
| 18 Aug 2019 | Hannah Sullivan | Philip Rosseter | "What then is love but mourning?" | Performer: Dorothy Linell. Singer: Steven Rickards. |
| 18 Aug 2019 | Hannah Sullivan | Schubert | String Quintet in C (2nd movement: Adagio) | Performer: Mstislav Leopoldovich Rostropovich. Ensemble: Emerson String Quartet. |
| 18 Aug 2019 | Hannah Sullivan | Nina Simone | "I want a little sugar in my bowl" | Performer: Nina Simone. |
| 18 Aug 2019 | Hannah Sullivan | Stravinsky | The Dove Descending | Choir: New College Oxford Choir. Conductor: Edward Higginbottom. |
| 25 Aug 2019 | James Ellroy | Beethoven | Piano Sonata No. 29 in B♭ major ("Hammerklavier") (3rd movement: Adagio) | Performer: Emil Gilels |
| 25 Aug 2019 | James Ellroy | Rachmaninoff | Étude-tableau in E♭ minor, Op. 39, No. 5 "Appassionato" | Performer: Van Cliburn |
| 25 Aug 2019 | James Ellroy | Richard Wagner | Tristan und Isolde (prelude) | Orchestra: Philharmonia Orchestra, conductor: Otto Klemperer |
| 25 Aug 2019 | James Ellroy | Shostakovich | Symphony No. 10 (1st movement: Moderato) | Orchestra: Berlin Philharmonic, conductor: Herbert von Karajan |
| 25 Aug 2019 | James Ellroy | Mahler | Symphony No. 5 (4th movement: Adagietto) | Orchestra: Bavarian Radio Symphony Orchestra, conductor: Rafael Kubelík |
| 25 Aug 2019 | James Ellroy | Bruckner | Symphony No. 7 (2nd movement: Adagio) | Orchestra: Leipzig Gewandhaus Orchestra, conductor: Andris Nelsons |
| 8 Sep 2019 | David Cannadine | Camille Saint-Saëns | Danse Macabre | Orchestra: The Philadelphia Orchestra. Conductor: Eugene Ormandy. |
| 8 Sep 2019 | David Cannadine | Arthur Sullivan | Overture: Iolanthe | Orchestra: Pro Arte Orchestra. Conductor: Malcolm Sargent. |
| 8 Sep 2019 | David Cannadine | Haydn | "The Heavens are Telling" (The Creation) | Orchestra: London Symphony Orchestra. Conductor: Colin Davis. Choir: London Symphony Chorus. |
| 8 Sep 2019 | David Cannadine | William Walton | Symphony No. 1 (1st movement: Allegro Assai) | Orchestra: BBC Symphony Orchestra. Conductor: Edward Gardner. |
| 8 Sep 2019 | David Cannadine | Henry Purcell | Fairest Isle (King Arthur ) | Orchestra: London Philharmonic Orchestra. Conductor: Anthony Lewis. Singer: Heather Harper. |
| 8 Sep 2019 | David Cannadine | Gregorio Allegri | Miserere | Choir: Tallis Scholars. Conductor: Peter Phillips. |
| 15 Sep 2019 | Siri Hustvedt | Hildegard von Bingen | Ave generosa | Singer: Margaret Philpot. Choir: Gothic Voices. Conductor: Christopher Page. |
| 15 Sep 2019 | Siri Hustvedt | Bach | Cantata No. 147: Herz und Mund und Tat und Leben (excerpt) | Choir: The Sixteen, conductor: Harry Christophers |
| 15 Sep 2019 | Siri Hustvedt | Berlioz | Villanelle (Nuits d'Ete) | Singer: Janet Baker. Orchestra: London Symphony Orchestra. Conductor: Evgeny Fyodorovich Svetlanov. |
| 15 Sep 2019 | Siri Hustvedt | Anton Webern | 6 Pieces for Orchestra, Op. 6 (excerpt) | Orchestra: Berlin Philharmonic Orchestra. Conductor: Pierre Boulez. |
| 15 Sep 2019 | Siri Hustvedt | John Cage | Sonata V (Sonatas and Interludes) | Performer: Boris Berman. |
| 15 Sep 2019 | Siri Hustvedt | Meredith Monk | "Scared Song" (Acts from Under and Above) | Performer: Meredith Monk. Performer: Nurit Tilles. |
| 15 Sep 2019 | Siri Hustvedt | Mozart | "Là ci darem la mano" (Don Giovanni) | Singers: Bernd Weikl, Lucia Popp, orchestra: London Philharmonic Orchestra, conductor: Georg Solti |
| 15 Sep 2019 | Siri Hustvedt | Sophie Auster | Black Water | Performer: Sophie Auster. |
| 22 Sep 2019 | Jock Stirrup | Josquin des Prez | "De profundis clamavi" | Choir: Orlando Consort. |
| 22 Sep 2019 | Jock Stirrup | Wagner | Leb' wohl (Die Walküre, act 3) | Singer: Hans Hotter. Orchestra: Orchester der Bayreuther Festspiele. Conductor: Joseph Kielberth. |
| 22 Sep 2019 | Jock Stirrup | Bach | "Dona nobis pacem" (Mass in B minor) | Choir: Monteverdi Choir, conductor: Sir John Eliot Gardiner |
| 22 Sep 2019 | Jock Stirrup | Felix Mendelssohn | Octet (4th movement: Presto) | Ensemble: Emerson String Quartet. |
| 22 Sep 2019 | Jock Stirrup | George Benjamin | Written on Skin (Scene 8) | Orchestra: Mahler Chamber Orchestra. Conductor: George Benjamin. Singer: Barbara Hannigan. Singer: Christopher Purves. |
| 22 Sep 2019 | Jock Stirrup | Beethoven | Piano Sonata No. 23 in F minor, Op. 57 "Appasionata" (3rd movement: Finale) | Performer: Wilhelm Kempff |
| 22 Sep 2019 | Jock Stirrup | Miles Davis | Flamenco Sketches | Performer: Miles Davis. |
| 6 Oct 2019 | Deborah Levy | Kurt Weill | "Alabama Song" | Singer: Lotte Lenya. |
| 6 Oct 2019 | Deborah Levy | Gluck | "What is Life" (Orfeo ed Euridice) | Singer: Kathleen Ferrier. Orchestra: London Symphony Orchestra. Conductor: Malcolm Sargent. |
| 6 Oct 2019 | Deborah Levy | Billy Cowie | La Lune Blanche | Singer: Lucie Robson. Singer: Cathryn Robson. Piano: Billy Cowie. |
| 6 Oct 2019 | Deborah Levy | W. A. Mozart | "Soave sia il vento" (Così fan tutte) | Singers: Yvonne Minton, Margaret Price, Geraint Evans, orchestra: New Philharmonia Orchestra, conductor: Otto Klemperer |
| 6 Oct 2019 | Deborah Levy | Leonard Cohen | "Night Comes On" | Singer: Leonard Cohen. |
| 6 Oct 2019 | Deborah Levy | Beethoven | Piano Sonata No. 8 in C minor, Op. 13 (Pathétique) (1st movement: Andante) | Performer: Daniel Barenboim |
| 6 Oct 2019 | Deborah Levy | Traditional music | "Black is the colour of my true love's hair" | Singer: Nina Simone. |
| 13 Oct 2019 | Peter Tatchell | John Barry | The Beyondness of Things | Orchestra: English Chamber Orchestra. |
| 13 Oct 2019 | Peter Tatchell | Sergei Prokofiev | "The Battle on the Ice" (Alexander Nevsky) | Orchestra: London Symphony Orchestra. Conductor: André Previn. |
| 13 Oct 2019 | Peter Tatchell | Mozart | "Der Hölle Rache" (The Magic Flute) | Orchestra: Vienna Philharmonic, conductor: Georg Solti, singer: Cristina Deutekom |
| 13 Oct 2019 | Peter Tatchell | Gerry Mulligan | "Venus de Milo" | Performer: Prince. |
| 13 Oct 2019 | Peter Tatchell | Xian Xinghai | Yellow River Concerto | Performer: Lang Lang. Orchestra: China Philharmonic Orchestra. Conductor: Long Yu. |
| 13 Oct 2019 | Peter Tatchell | Samuel Barber | Adagio for Strings | Performer: William Orbit. Music Arranger: William Orbit. |
| 13 Oct 2019 | Peter Tatchell | Billy Cobham | Bolinas | Performer: Billy Cobham. |
| 20 Oct 2019 | Selina Cadell | Traditional music | "O Waly Waly" | Performer: Natalie Burch. Singer: Robert Murray. |
| 20 Oct 2019 | Selina Cadell | Stravinsky | "No Word from Tom" (The Rake's Progress) | Singer: Cathryn Pope. Orchestra: London Sinfonietta. Conductor: Riccardo Chailly. |
| 20 Oct 2019 | Selina Cadell | Noël Coward | "I Travel Alone" | Performer: Noël Coward. |
| 20 Oct 2019 | Selina Cadell | Debussy | "La Mer" | Orchestra: Orchestre national de France. Conductor: Daniele Gatti. |
| 20 Oct 2019 | Selina Cadell | Elizabeth Poston | Jesus Christ the Apple Tree | Choir: King's College Cambridge Choir. Conductor: Sir David Willcocks. |
| 20 Oct 2019 | Selina Cadell | Handel | "Son qual stanco pellegrino" (from Arianna in Creta) | Singer: Theodora Baka |
| 27 Oct 2019 | Venki Ramakrishnan | Bach | Concerto in D for Two Violins, BWV 1043 (2nd movement: Largo) | Performers: Herman Krebbers, Arthur Grumiaux, ensemble: Les Solistes Romands, conductor: Árpád Gérecz |
| 27 Oct 2019 | Venki Ramakrishnan | W. A. Mozart | Violin Sonata No. 28 in E♭, K. 380 (3rd movement: Rondo: Allegro) | Performers: Henryk Szeryng (violin), Ingrid Haebler (piano) |
| 27 Oct 2019 | Venki Ramakrishnan | Bach | Violin Partita No. 3 in E (Prelude) | Performer: Nathan Milstein |
| 27 Oct 2019 | Venki Ramakrishnan | Brahms | Piano Quartet No. 3 in C (3rd movement: Andante) | Performer: Arthur Rubinstein. Performer: Guarneri Quartet. |
| 27 Oct 2019 | Venki Ramakrishnan | Beethoven | Cello Sonata No. 3 in A (3rd movement: Adagio – Allegro vivace) | Performers: Jacqueline du Pré (cello), Daniel Barenboim (piano) |
| 27 Oct 2019 | Venki Ramakrishnan | Schubert | Piano Trio in E♭ (2nd movement: Andante con moto) | Ensemble: Horszowski Trio. |
| 3 Nov 2019 | Philippa Perry | Chopin | Nocturne in F♯ major, Op. 15, No. 2 | Performer: Brigitte Engerer. |
| 3 Nov 2019 | Philippa Perry | Milton Ager | Hard-hearted Hanah the Vamp of Savannah | Performer: Dorothy Provine. |
| 3 Nov 2019 | Philippa Perry | Brahms | Violin Concerto in D major (2nd movement: Adagio) | Performer: Min Kym. Orchestra: Philharmonia Orchestra. Conductor: Sir Andrew Davis. |
| 3 Nov 2019 | Philippa Perry | Beethoven | Symphony No. 9 in D minor, Op. 125 ("Choral") (4th movement: Finale) | Conductor: Seiji Ozawa |
| 3 Nov 2019 | Philippa Perry | Shostakovich | Symphony No. 5 in D minor (4th movement: Finale) | Orchestra: London Symphony Orchestra. Conductor: Mstislav Leopoldovich Rostropovich. |
| 3 Nov 2019 | Philippa Perry | Verdi | La Traviata (act 1, excerpt) | Orchestra: Vienna Philharmonic. Conductor: Carlo Rizzi. Singer: Rolando Villazón. Singer: Anna Netrebko. Choir: Chor der Wiener Staatsoper. |
| 3 Nov 2019 | Philippa Perry | Rufus Wainwright | "Oh What a World" | Performer: Rufus Wainwright. |
| 10 Nov 2019 | Ken Loach | Brahms | Academic Festival Overture | Orchestra: London Philharmonic Orchestra. Conductor: Marin Alsop. |
| 10 Nov 2019 | Ken Loach | Ewan MacColl | "Dirty Old Town" | Singer: Ewan MacColl. Singer: Peggy Seeger. |
| 10 Nov 2019 | Ken Loach | Beethoven | Symphony No. 5 in C minor, Op. 67 (1st movement: Allegro con brio) | Vienna Philharmonic, conductor: Carlos Kleiber |
| 10 Nov 2019 | Ken Loach | Traditional music | "A Las Barricadas" | Music Arranger: George Fenton. |
| 10 Nov 2019 | Ken Loach | Tommy Makem | "Four Green Fields" | Performer: Jim McCann. Ensemble: The Dubliners. |
| 10 Nov 2019 | Ken Loach | Dick Gaughan | "Which Side are you On" | Performer: Dick Gaughan. |
| 10 Nov 2019 | Ken Loach | Pierre Degeyter | "La Internacional" | Music Arranger: George Fenton. |
| 10 Nov 2019 | Ken Loach | Mozart | Piano Concerto No. 21 in C major (2nd movement) | Performer: Géza Anda, orchestra: Camerata Salzburg |
| 10 Nov 2019 | Ken Loach | Schubert | Impromptu in G♭ major, D.899, no. 3 | Performer: Mitsuko Uchida. |
| 10 Nov 2019 | Ken Loach | Antonín Dvořák | Cello Concerto in B minor (Finale: Allegro moderato) | Performer: Mstislav Rostropovich, orchestra: Berlin Philharmonic, conductor: Herbert von Karajan |
| 17 Nov 2019 | YolanDa Brown | YolanDa Brown | "Million Billion Love" | Performer: YolanDa Brown. |
| 17 Nov 2019 | YolanDa Brown | Arthur Sullivan | Iolanthe – Overture | Orchestra: Royal Ballet Sinfonia, conductor: Andrew Penny |
| 17 Nov 2019 | YolanDa Brown | Kamasi Washington | "Desire" | Performer: Kamasi Washington. |
| 17 Nov 2019 | YolanDa Brown | Schubert | Impromptu in F minor, D.935, No. 1 | Performer: Rudolf Serkin. |
| 17 Nov 2019 | YolanDa Brown | Leonard Bernstein | "Maria" | Performer: Dave Brubeck. Music Arranger: Dave Brubeck. |
| 17 Nov 2019 | YolanDa Brown | Hans Zimmer | Earth | Orchestra: BBC Scottish Symphony Orchestra. Choir: Royal Scottish National Orchestra Chorus. Conductor: Roderick Cox. |
| 17 Nov 2019 | YolanDa Brown | Bobby McFerrin | Say Ladeo | Performer: Bobby McFerrin. Performer: Roger Treece. Performer: Lisa Fischer. Performer: Alex Acuña. |
| 17 Nov 2019 | YolanDa Brown | Antonín Dvořák | Symphony No. 9 in E minor (From the New World) (4th movement: Allegro con fuoco) | Orchestra: Chineke! Orchestra, conductor: Kevin John Edusei |
| 1 Dec 2019 | Hannah Rankin | Felix Mendelssohn | Overture: The Hebrides (Fingal's Cave) | Orchestra: London Symphony Orchestra. Conductor: Sir John Eliot Gardiner. |
| 1 Dec 2019 | Hannah Rankin | Jean Sibelius | Finlandia | Orchestra: Helsinki Philharmonic Orchestra. Conductor: Paavo Berglund. |
| 1 Dec 2019 | Hannah Rankin | Tchaikovsky | "Kuda, kuda" (Eugene Onegin) | Singer: Stuart Burrows. Orchestra: Orchestra of the Royal Opera House, Covent Garden. Conductor: Georg Solti. |
| 1 Dec 2019 | Hannah Rankin | Jackson Browne | "Take it easy" | km_ Glenn Frey. Ensemble: Eagles. |
| 1 Dec 2019 | Hannah Rankin | Engelbert Humperdinck | Evening Prayer (Hansel und Gretel) | Singer: Barbara Bonney. Singer: Anne Sofie von Otter. Orchestra: Bavarian Radio Symphony Orchestra. Conductor: Jeffrey Tate. |
| 1 Dec 2019 | Hannah Rankin | Tchaikovsky | Symphony No. 6 in B minor (Pathetique) (Finale) | Orchestra: Czech Philharmonic. Conductor: Semyon Bychkov. |
| 1 Dec 2019 | Hannah Rankin | Scott Joplin | "Maple Leaf Rag" | Performer: Lang Lang. |
| 8 Dec 2019 | David Nott | Traditional Welsh | Myfanwy | Ensemble: Casi and the Blind Harpist. |
| 8 Dec 2019 | David Nott | Elgar | "Nimrod" (Enigma Variations) | Orchestra: Royal Liverpool Philharmonic Orchestra. Conductor: Vasily Petrenko. |
| 8 Dec 2019 | David Nott | Amadou & Mariam | Senegal Fast Food | Performer: Amadou & Mariam. |
| 8 Dec 2019 | David Nott | Ralph Vaughan Williams | "The Lark Ascending" | Matthew Trusler (violin), Iain Burnside (piano) |
| 8 Dec 2019 | David Nott | Debussy | "Clair de lune" | Performer: Stephen Hough. |
| 8 Dec 2019 | David Nott | Traditional music Arabic | Ya Mayela al-Ghusoon | Performer: لينا شاماميان. |
| 8 Dec 2019 | David Nott | Dave Charles | Llef (Deus Salutis) | Choir: Dunvant Male Choir. |
| 22 Dec 2019 | Matthew Bourne | Kenneth Sillito & Hamish Milne | The Sussex Mummers' Christmas Carol | |
| 22 Dec 2019 | Matthew Bourne | Tchaikovsky | The Rose Adagio (The Sleeping Beauty, act 1) | Orchestra: Russian State Academy Orchestra. Conductor: Vladimir Jurowski. |
| 22 Dec 2019 | Matthew Bourne | Richard Rodgers | "Climb Ev'ry Mountain" (The Sound of Music) | Singer: Peggy Wood. |
| 22 Dec 2019 | Matthew Bourne | Sergei Prokofiev | Aubade – Dance of the Girls with Lilies (Romeo and Juliet) | Orchestra: Baltimore Symphony Orchestra, conductor: Marin Alsop |
| 22 Dec 2019 | Matthew Bourne | Bernard Herrmann | The Ghost and Mrs Muir (Main Titles) | Orchestra: City of Prague Philharmonic Orchestra. Conductor: Paul Bateman. |
| 22 Dec 2019 | Matthew Bourne | Richar Sherman | "Feed the Birds" (Mary Poppins) | km_ Robert Sherman. Singer: Julie Andrews. |
| 22 Dec 2019 | Matthew Bourne | Danny Elfman | Edward Scissorhands (Title Sequence) | Ensemble: Soundtrack. |
| 29 Dec 2019 | Darcey Bussell | Mozart | Introitus (Requiem) | Orchestra: London Mozart Players, choir: BBC Singers, conductor: Jane Glover |
| 29 Dec 2019 | Darcey Bussell | Francis Poulenc | "Laudamus Te" (Gloria) | Orchestra: Boston Symphony Orchestra. Choir: Tanglewood Festival Chorus. Conductor: Seiji Ozawa. |
| 29 Dec 2019 | Darcey Bussell | Tchaikovsky | Pas de deux – Adagio (The Sleeping Beauty, act 3) | Orchestra: Orchestra of the Royal Opera House, Covent Garden; conductor: Mark Ermler |
| 29 Dec 2019 | Darcey Bussell | Stravinsky | Pas de deux (Agon) | Orchestra: New York City Ballet Orchestra. Conductor: Robert Irving. |
| 29 Dec 2019 | Darcey Bussell | Sylvius Leopold Weiss | Fantasia in C minor | Performer: Andrés Segovia. |
| 29 Dec 2019 | Darcey Bussell | Noël Coward | "Mad About the Boy" | Singer: Dinah Washington. |
| 29 Dec 2019 | Darcey Bussell | Gabriel Fauré | "In Paradisum" (Requiem) | Orchestra: Orchestra of the Age of Enlightenment. Choir: Choir of King's College, Cambridge. Conductor: Stephen Cleobury. |
| 29 Dec 2019 | Darcey Bussell | Sting | "Roxanne" | Ensemble: The Police. |
