= Tout-Paris =

French expression referring to the Parisian elite

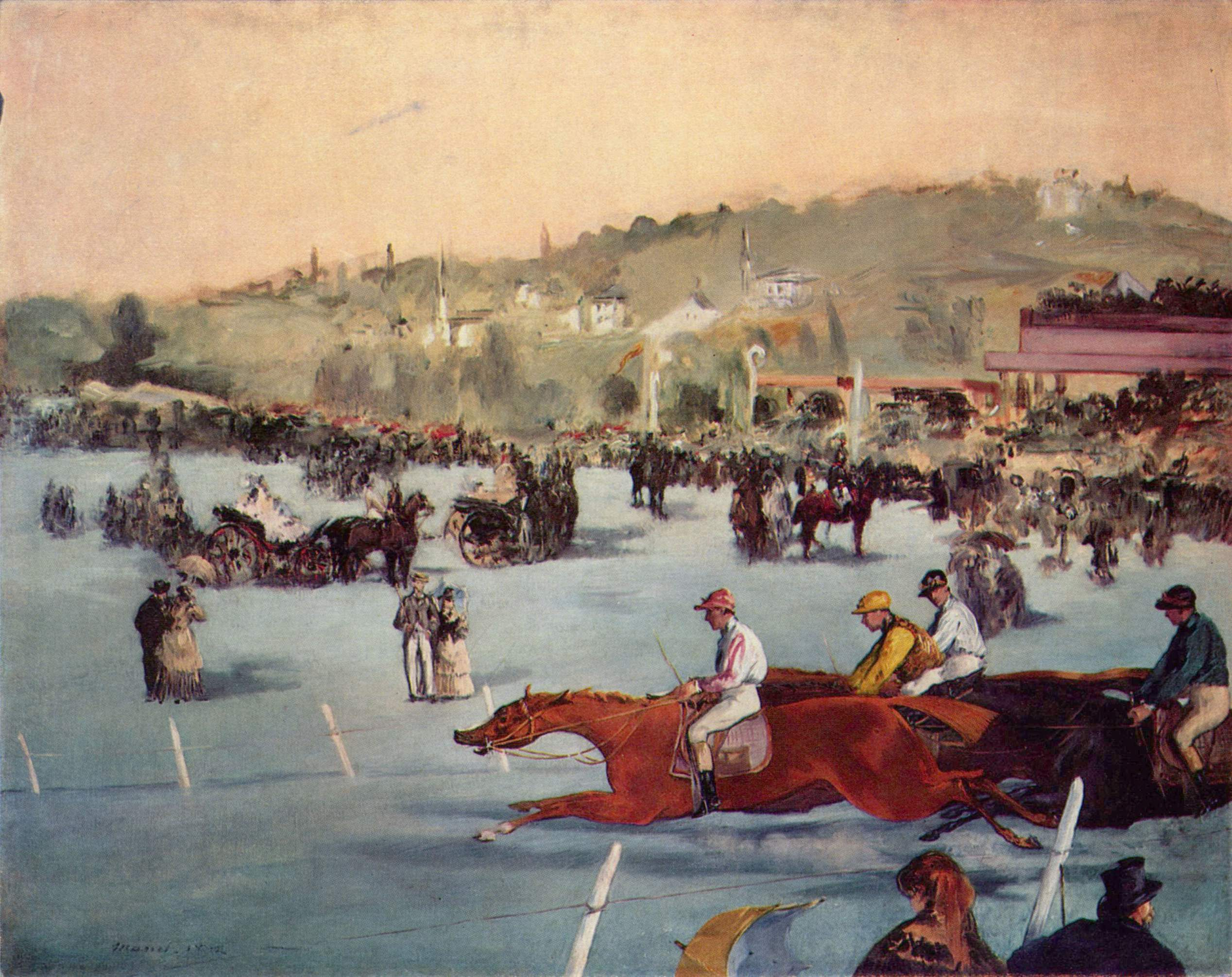
During the 19th-century Belle Époque (beautiful era), le Tout-Paris often attended horse races as fashionable entertainment at Paris' Bois de Boulogne park. (Édouard Manet, Courses au Bois de Boulogne, 1872)

Le Tout-Paris (lit. 'All-Paris') is a French expression referring to the stylish and affluent elite of Paris, who frequent fashionable events and places, and establish trends in upper-class culture. It is equivalent to high society or the jet set elsewhere.

== History ==
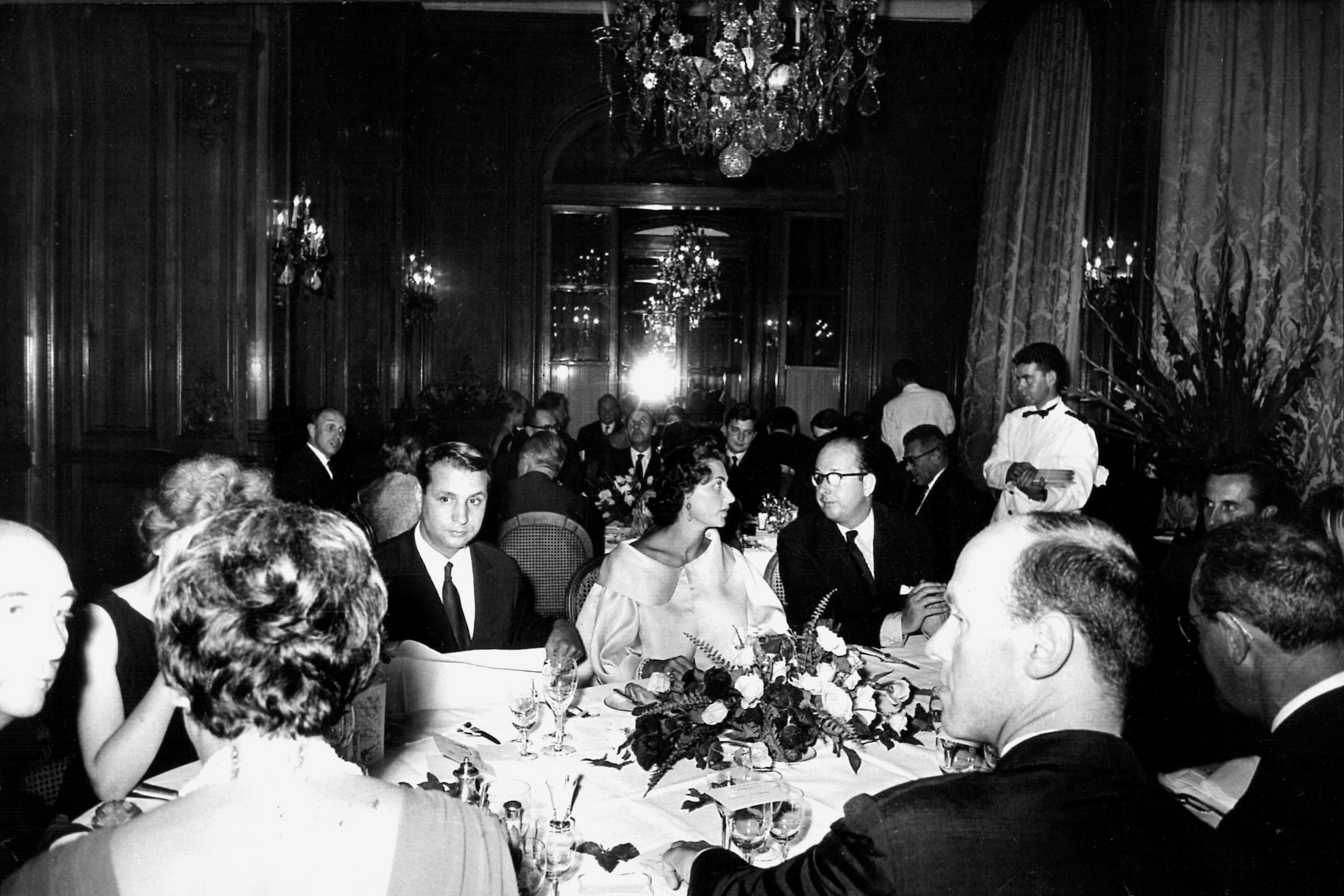
A dinner for fashion designer Charles Jourdan at the trendy Plaza Athénée hotel in Paris, 1962.

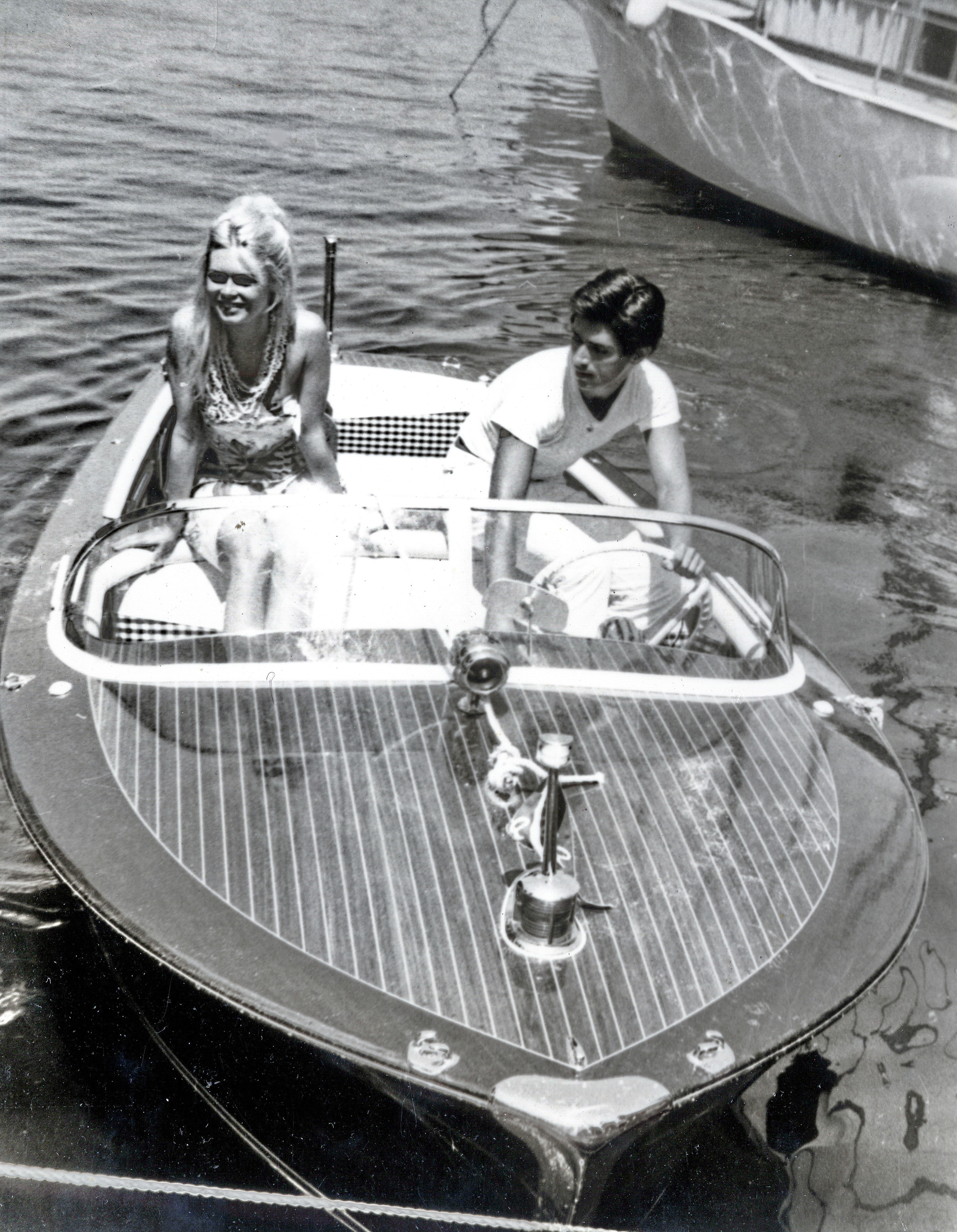
The popular understanding of fashionable Tout-Paris has grown to include celebrities such as actress Brigitte Bardot, here in Saint-Tropez on the French Riviera, 1963.

The expression tout-Paris was used in the 17th century to refer to high society among the aristocratic inhabitants of the city of Paris. It was used in 1660 by Nicolas Boileau in his Satires to refer to the influential members of Parisian society who made Pierre Corneille's play El Cid popular, in the famous sentence, "In vain, a minister sought support against El Cid—Tout Paris supported Chimene in love with Rodrigue". Boileau also used the expression in Chant III: "Where tout Paris as a crowd bears its sufferings". Voltaire and Jean le Rond D'Alembert also used the expression in their correspondence.

The current use of the expression Tout-Paris dates from the Belle Époque era of 19th-century Paris. Historian Anne Martin-Fugier dates it to the beginning of the 19th century, when in the aftermath of the French Revolution and the rise of Napoleon, the non-aristocratic elites of the city began playing a role at the top of the city's affluent culture, forming a new social class.

A group made up of writers, politicians, bankers and prominent artists, this community lived in fashionable neighbourhoods, went to the theatre, and attended receptions at embassies. It also embodied a certain idea of Parisians' "good taste" (bon goût), setting trends with its pastimes, such as horse racing and holidays at the seaside. The activities of Tout-Paris were noted in the mass media.

An article in Le Gaulois, from August 24, 1895, titled "Mondanités: Paris hors Paris" (Worldly events: Paris outside of Paris), noted that composer Camille Saint-Saëns arrived at the coastal resort of Dieppe and gave a detailed list of other noteworthy social figures also present in the town: "It is tout Paris, that can be seen: Count and Countess Louis de Talleyrand-Périgord, M. Josselin de Rohan, Mme Madeleine Lemaire, M. Marcel Proust et M. Reynaldo Hahn, who are the hosts of the eminent artist."

Evoking the year 1841, poet Charles Baudelaire saw in Tout-Paris above all the passionate followers of literature and poetry: "During this time, tout Paris was made up of this elite group given the role of fashioning others' opinions, and who, when a poet is born, are always the first to be notified."

During the Belle Époque, Tout-Paris became a sort of club with its own rules. In 1901 the Annuaire du Tout Paris (Tout Paris Annual) appeared, counting writer Marcel Proust among its readers. Upon its creation in 1903, the Bottin mondain (fr) directory of high society in fact presented only a list of Parisian personalities. Le Tout-Paris was associated with particular fashionable places in the city, such as the restaurant Maxim's, the large urban forest Bois de Boulogne, Deauville, and so on, defining trends, giving an artist or writer their blessing, making or unmaking the reputation of a politician.

Beginning in the 1950s, Tout-Paris became increasingly associated with personalities connected with certain trendy nightclubs, such as Régine, creating notable discos where celebrities could be seen, among them Françoise Sagan, Jean-Claude Brialy, Jacques Chazot, Françoise Giroud, Yves Saint-Laurent, and so on.

== Tout-Paris today ==
Today, the expression is sometimes used to refer to subgroups of Paris culture's elite (the "literary tout-Paris", the "political tout-Paris", and so on), somewhat losing its original meaning, now referring to a broader group of arts personalities, athletes, media figures, or politicians covered in the popular media. Their attendance is covered at events such as concerts, galas, premiers, art gallery vernissages and nightclubs in the capitol.

With global travel and fashion, it is often used interchangeably with the global jet set of trendsetters. The rise of the tabloid press in the 20th century, and the blending of entertainment and current events news in publications such as Paris Match, has added to this public perception of Parisian celebrity.

== See also ==
- Belle Époque
- Culture of Paris
- Fame in the 20th Century
- Paris Match

== Bibliography ==
- Françoise Giroud, Françoise Giroud vous présente le Tout-Paris, Gallimard, 1952
