= Glued to the Box =

Book written by Clive James

- Author: Jonathan Cape
- Language: English
- Genre: Television criticism
- Publisher: Jonathan Cape
- Publication date: 1983
- Publication place: United Kingdom

Glued to the Box (TV Criticism from the Observer 1979–1982), is a 1983 book featuring the third and final collection of television criticism that Clive James wrote for The Observer.

== Synopsis ==
It includes material from articles that run from 2 December 1979 to 28 March 1982. In the Introduction he writes that he had, "never thought of television criticism as a career. It is the sort of thing one goes into with a whole heart but not for ones whole life." The volume finishes with his "standing up and moving aside" for his successor, Julian Barnes. "No doubt he will slag one of my programmes first chance he gets, but by then I will be in the habit of damning all critics as fools." The book is dedicated to Pat Kavanagh and Dan Kavanagh and carries an epigraph from Charles Péguy at its start.

== Reception ==
The London Review of Books wrote: "Along with its two predecessors, (Visions Before Midnight and The Crystal Bucket), it will stand as a once-only critical phenomenon: ten years worth of high intelligence and wit." Sheridan Morley called him "far and away the funniest writer in regular Fleet Street employment."

== See also ==
- 1983 in television
- British television
- Television studies
