= Lady Gaga: Queen of Pop =

2010 biography by Emily Herbert

Lady Gaga
- Book cover, UK edition
- Author: Emily Herbert
- Subject: Lady Gaga
- Genre: Biography
- Publisher: John Blake Publishing Ltd.
- Publication date: 2010
- Publication place: United Kingdom
- Media type: Paperback
- Pages: 288
- ISBN: 1-84454-963-1
- OCLC: 515459835

Lady Gaga: Queen of Pop is a biography of American singer Lady Gaga. It was written by Emily Herbert (pen name for the journalist Virginia Blackburn) and published in the United Kingdom by John Blake Publishing Ltd. The book was published by Overlook Press in the United States with the title Lady Gaga: Behind the Fame. Additional versions under the title Lady Gaga: Queen of Pop were published in 2010 by Wilkinson Publishing of Melbourne in Australia and by Gardners Books in the United Kingdom. The book discusses Gaga's early life when she was known as Stefani Joanne Angelina Germanotta from her birth in 1986, and chronicles her education at Convent of the Sacred Heart in New York, her early visits to nightclubs with her mother to perform at open-mic events, and her brief foray into the Tisch School of the Arts, leading up to her first experience of fame. Germanotta took the name "Lady Gaga" from the song "Radio Ga Ga" by the rock group Queen; she released her first album The Fame in 2008. Lady Gaga: Queen of Pop describes the musician's success in the industry, noting her business collaborations and appearance on the cover of Rolling Stone in 2009.

Lady Gaga: Queen of Pop received a mixed reception, and a reviewer for the Orlando Sentinel wrote a positive review. The Herald Sun criticized the book's style of commentary and its chronological organization style. A book critic for the St. Petersburg Times wrote positively about the photographs of Gaga in the book. The Phoenix New Times characterized its style as tending towards a positive tone, and compared it to a Wikipedia entry. A reviewer for the Minneapolis Star-Tribune criticized the book for being predictable. Ms. Magazine said that the book describes the musician's business acumen and motivation to maintain control of her image. A reviewer for the Las Vegas Review-Journal wrote that the book presented a detailed biography of the musician.

== Author ==
Emily Herbert is the pen name of British journalist Virginia Blackburn. Blackburn wrote articles about Lady Gaga in publications including The Express, and the Herald Sun. Her biography of Katie Price, Katie and Peter: Too Much in Love, became a number one bestseller in the category of paperback non-fiction. She also wrote Michael Jackson: King of Pop, Kerry: Story of a Survivor (about Kerry Katona), Robbie: A Life Less Ordinary (Robbie Williams), and Gok Wan: The Biography (Gok Wan). Blackburn specializes in celebrity biographies; she motivates herself to write 5,000 words per day. Overlook Press stated it was the first published biography about Lady Gaga.

== Contents ==
Lady Gaga: Queen of Pop has 288 pages, including 32 pages of photographs of the musician. The author compares Lady Gaga to Madonna, writing that both are independent and work to assert control over their futures. The book discusses Lady Gaga's early life and background, including her upbringing in a New York City household with her father, a businessman. Born Stefani Joanne Angelina Germanotta on March 28, 1986, from age 11 she attended Convent of the Sacred Heart high school; the same high school as Paris Hilton. Germanotta was not popular with her fellow pupils because of her experimentation with exotic dance, drugs, and bisexuality. By age 13, she had written her first song and her mother took her to nightclubs to perform at open-mic events. Germanotta gained entry to the Tisch School of the Arts in New York at age 17, but left and started using drugs while performing as a go-go dancer. After a period of difficulty with her father, she ceased this behavior pattern.

Germanotta adopted a new name, "Lady Gaga", which came from the rock group Queen's song "Radio Ga Ga". She learned that with a new identity she could gain attention, which she appreciated. Her first album, titled The Fame, was released in August 2008 and included the hit songs "Poker Face" and "Just Dance." She had an emotional separation from her boyfriend named Luke, who was a heavy metal drummer, but she continued to focus on her music and her work. The Fame became successful worldwide, and Gaga started the group "Haus of Gaga", whose contributing endeavors include sound design, clothing, and stage production. She appeared on the cover of Rolling Stone in May 2009, and performed with bands including Take That and the Pussycat Dolls on their world tours.

== Reception ==
Jim Abbott of the Orlando Sentinel described the book as "a breathless new biography" by Herbert. In a review in the Herald Sun, Blanche Clark was critical and said, "Herbert's loose timeline is irritating, as is some of her glib commentary, such as: 'When her parents took her out to restaurants, she would use the breadsticks as drum batons—music was clearly in the blood.'" St. Petersburg Times book critic Colette Bancroft said of the images in the book, "I can tell you lots of the photos are fun, although a few are a little scary, like the one in which she looks like a space alien awaiting a gynecological exam."

Writing for the Minneapolis Star-Tribune, Kristin Tillotson wrote that Lady Gaga: Queen of Pop is a "quickie, predictably vapid bio". Noelle Williams of Ms. Magazine wrote that the book "adds to the already familiar growing-up-Catholic-school-girl backstory new insight into Gaga's artistic vision and business savvy. In an industry in which many women (and some men) are shepherded to stardom with little input, Gaga appears to be completely in control of her image."

Writing for Phoenix New Times, Nicki Escudero compared the book to an entry on Wikipedia. She wrote, "It's sort of like a really expanded Wikipedia entry, if you like that type of thing, though Herbert's voice shows that she's definitely a fan, and the book isn't completely unbiased—it's a very revering [sic] tale of Gaga's 24-year-old life." Sharon Galligar Chance reviewed the book for the Las Vegas Review-Journal, and wrote, "Using references from many, many different sources, Herbert has put together a fairly solid biography of the new pop icon". She concluded her review saying, "Although sometimes redundant, Herbert ... does give the reader a full-bodied accounting of the persona behind Lady Gaga".

== See also ==
- Celebrity biographer
- Celebrity branding
- Fame in the 20th Century
