= Sydney Writers Walk =

Series of commemorative plaques on Circular Quay, Sydney

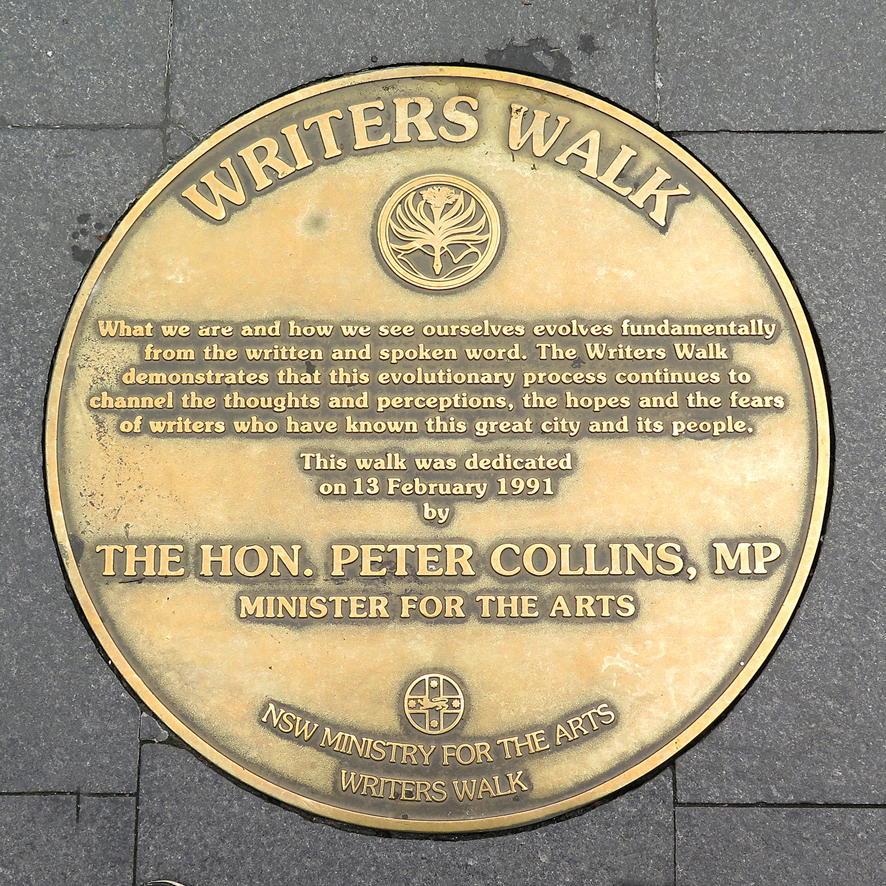
Dedication plaque for Sydney Writers Walk 13 February 1991

Map

The Sydney Writers Walk is a series of 60 circular metal plaques embedded in the footpath between Overseas Passenger Terminal on West Circular Quay and the Sydney Opera House forecourt on East Circular Quay.

The plaques were installed to honour and celebrate the lives and works of well-known Australian writers, as well as notable overseas authors who lived in or visited Australia, such as D. H. Lawrence, Joseph Conrad and Mark Twain. Quotes from a significant work and some biographical information about the writer are stamped onto each plaque, along with an excerpt of the author's writing.

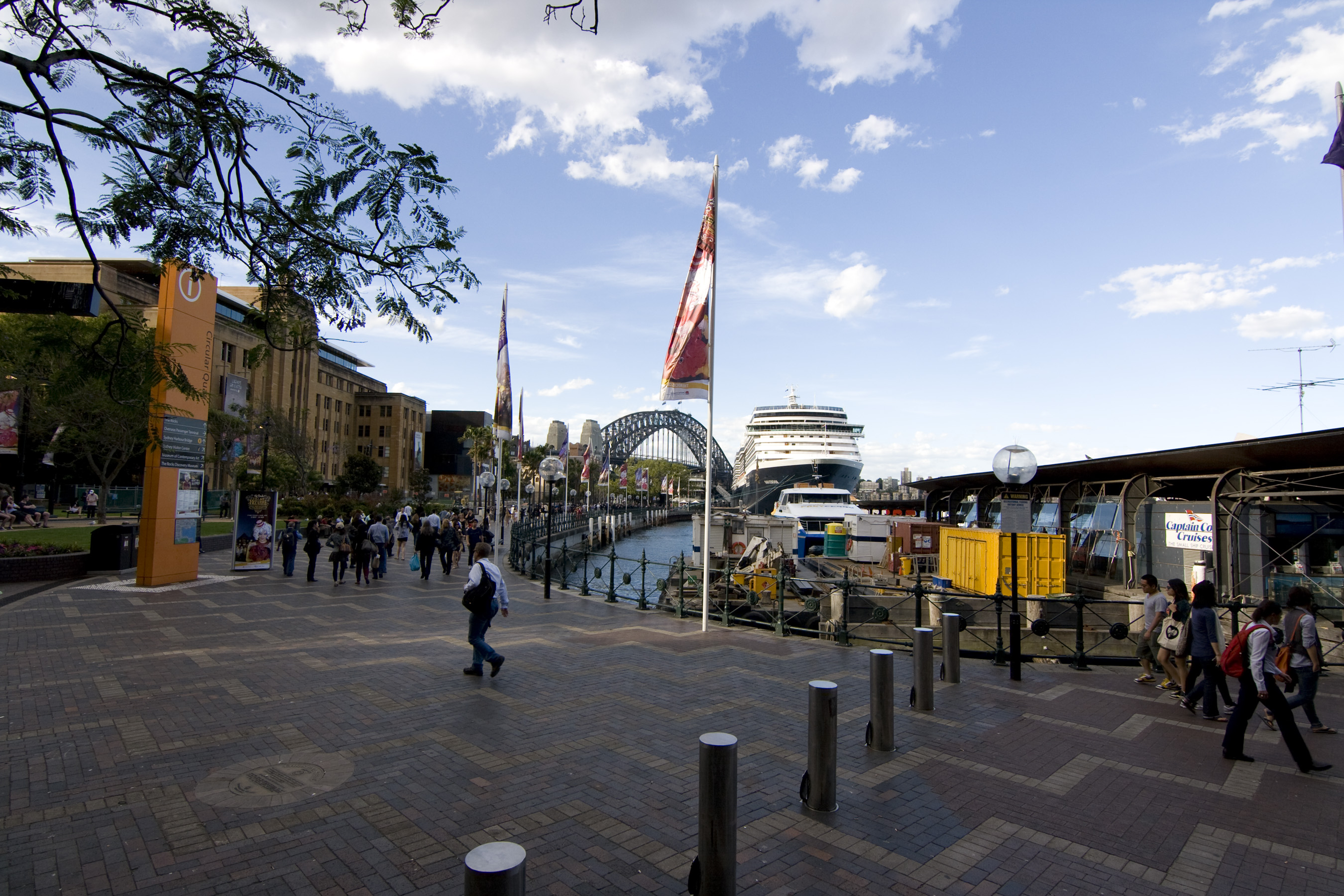
West Circular Quay, with the plaque of Christina Stead; Museum of Contemporary Art (left), Sydney Harbour Bridge (background)

The walk was created by the NSW Ministry for the Arts in 1991, and the series was extended when a further 11 plaques were added in 2011. However, as one journalist pointed out, the plaques are not updated. For example, Thea Astley's plaque gives the year she was born (1925) but there is no reference to her death in 2004. The same is true for Oodgeroo Noonuccal, who died in 1993; Judith Wright (d. 2000); A. D. Hope (d.2000); Dorothy Hewett (d.2002), and Ruth Park (d.2010).

In 2014 the Rotary Club of Sydney Cove published a guide to the Walk.

== List ==
Writers marked with an asterisk * were the subject of plaques added to the Walk in 2011.

Plaque	Writer	Dates	Quote	Source
	Jessica Anderson *	1916–2010	In ... Sydney I became conscious for the first time of the points of the compass, and felt for the first time the airs of three other climates, borne onto my skin by the three prevailing winds.	Tirra Lirra by the River (1978)
	Thea Astley	1925–2004	Queensland isn't the home of the tall yarn. It's where the tall yarn happens, acted out on a stage where, despite its vastness, the oddballs see and recognise each other across the no-miles and wave their understanding.	Being a Queenslander (1976)
	Faith Bandler	1918–2015	The blueness of the sky folded into the sea and it was never-ending. It was always like this. Everything was eternal. The moons came and went and came again. The sun came every day. When the dark thick clouds which brought the rain covered the sun, there was no need to think about them, even to notice them, because the sun would come again.	Wacvie (1977)
	C.E.W. Bean	1879–1968	Australia is a big blank map, and the whole people is constantly sitting over it like a committee, trying to work out the best way to fill it in.	The Dreadnought of the Darling (1911)
	Christopher Brennan	1870–1932	...I know I am the wanderer of the ways of all the worlds, to whom the sunshine and the rain are one and one to stay or hasten, because he knows no ending of the way, no home, no goal...	The Wanderer (1913)
	Peter Carey	1943–	... glass is a thing in disguise, an actor, is not solid at all, but a liquid, and while it is as frail as the ice on a Parramatta puddle, it is stronger under compression than Sydney sandstone ... it is invisible, solid, a joyous and paradoxical thing ...	Oscar and Lucinda (1988)
	Marcus Clarke *	1846–1881	All the wealth in the world could not purchase the self-respect which had been cut out of him by the lash, or banish from his brain the memory of his degradation.	For the Term of His Natural Life (1874)
	Manning Clark *	1915–1991	The proposals for the use of a southern continent had a history almost as long though by no means so distinguished as the history of its discovery. Some saw it as land dedicated to the Holy Spirit; some saw it as a land fit only for the refuse of society.	A History of Australia Volume 1 (1962)
	Joseph Conrad	1857–1924	Sydney Harbour ... one of the finest, most beautiful, vast, and safe bays the sun had ever shone upon.	Mirror of the Sea (1906)
	Peter Corris	1942–2018	The sun was going down as I stop-started along in the lane for drivers who didn't have the right money to pay the toll. The sky was clear and the water turned red-gold. The ferries and sailing ships seemed to be skating across a sheet of beaten bronze.	Wet Graves (1981)
	Dymphna Cusack *	1902–1981	Around them the jacaranda broke in a purplish shower, motionless, airy and unreal, as though all the bright morning was caught up in a fragile net of blossom.	Jungerau (1936)
	Eleanor Dark	1901–1985	Silence ruled this land. Out of silence mystery comes, and magic, and the delicate awareness of unreasoning things.	The Timeless Land (1941)
	Charles Darwin	1809–1882	This is really a wonderful Colony; ancient Rome, in her Imperial grandeur, would not have been ashamed of such an offspring.	Letter from Charles Darwin (1836)
	C.J.Dennis	1876–1938	It appened this way: I 'ad jist come down, After long years, to look at Sydney town. An'struth! Was I knocked endways? Fair su'prised? I never dreamed! That arch that cut the skies! The Bridge! ...	I Dips Me Lid (1936)
	Arthur Conan Doyle	1859–1930	We all devoted ourselves to surf-bathing, spending a good deal of our day in the water as is the custom of the place. It is a real romp with Nature, for the great Pacific rollers come sweeping in and break over you, rolling you over on the sand if they can catch you unawares. It was a golden patch in our restless lives.	The Wanderings of a Spiritualist (1921)
	Umberto Eco	1932–2016	L'Australia non è solo agli antipodi, è lontana da tutto, talora anche da se stessa. Australia is not only at the Antipodes, she is far away from everything, sometimes even from herself.	L'Espresso (1982)
	A.B. Facey *	1894–1982	I have lived a very good life, it has been very rich and full. I have been very fortunate and I am thrilled by it when I look back.	A Fortunate Life (1981)
	Miles Franklin	1879–1954	The sun came up through the Heads and stole its way to the Quay, far over the bay. Each of the tiny waves turned to flame, and as the sun rose higher it left pearly tracks across the water. A month would not be long enough to imbibe such beauty ...	My Career Goes Bung (1946)
	May Gibbs	1877–1969	Humans are as strong as the Wind, swift as the River, fierce as the Sun ... They whistle like the birds; they are as cruel as the snake. They have many skins which they take off many times. When all the skins are off the Human looks like a pale frog.	Tales of Snugglepot and Cuddlepie (1939)
	Mary Gilmore	1865–1962	Old Botany Bay; Taking the sun Shame on the mouth That would deny The knotted hands That set us high!	Old Botany Bay (1918)
	Germaine Greer	1939–	Australia is my birthplace but I cannot call it my own as well as my native land, for I have no right to live there. Until a treaty is agreed with the original inhabitants, I shall be homeless in the world.	Journal of the Plague Year (1988)
	Xavier Herbert	1901–1984	Like a city in a dream, that Capital to which I was bound rose out of verdant plains to meet my seeking eye, to become, as I neared it, like a lovely woman extending jewelled arms to draw me to her bosom.	Disturbing Element (1963)
	Dorothy Hewett	1923–2002	I had a tremendous world in my head and more than three-quarters of it will be buried with me.	Sally Banner in The Chapel Perilous (1971)
	A.D. Hope	1907–2000	... Yet there are some like me turn gladly home from the lush jungle of modern thought, to find The Arabian desert of the human mind, hoping, if still from the deserts the prophets come, Such savage and scarlet as no green hills dare Springs in that waste, some spirit which escapes The learned doubt, the chatter of cultured apes Which is called civilization over there.	Australia (1939)
	Donald Horne *	1921–2005	The good qualities of Australians ... their non-doctrinaire tolerance, their sense of pleasure, their sense of fair play, their interest in material things, their sense of family, their identity with nature ... their scepticism, their talent for improvisation, their courage and stoicism. These are great qualities that could constitute the beginnings of a great nation.	The Lucky Country (1964)
	Robert Hughes	1938–2012	Would Australians have done anything differently if their country had not been settled as the jail of infinite space? Certainly they would. They would have remembered more of their own history.	The Fatal Shore (1987)
	Barry Humphries	1934–2023	I think that I could never spy A poem lovely as a pie. A banquet in a single course Blushing with rich tomato sauce.	Neglected Poems and Other Creatures (1991)
	Clive James	1939–2019	In Sydney Harbour ... the yachts will be racing on the crushed diamond water under a sky the texture of powdered sapphires. It would be churlish not to concede that the same abundance of natural blessings which gave us the energy to leave has every right to call us back.	Unreliable Memoirs (1980)
	George Johnston	1912–1970	Sydney is a city of light and wind more than of architecture ... The majesties of nature and the monstrosities of man have a cheek by jowl evidence in Sydney more insistent, I think, than in any other city in the world.	Clean Straw for Nothing (1969)
	Elizabeth Jolley *	1923–2007	One day poets will come and teach the inhabitants of this strange country to look on the loveliness around them. Each of us creates his own vision of Australia and we see with our minds and our memories as much as with our eyes.	Central Mischief (1992)
	Thomas Keneally	1935–	The place which had been chosen for this far-off commonwealth and prison, and named Sydney Cove (in the spirit of events), faced the sun, which was always in the north ... The land on either side of the cove was divided down the middle by a freshwater stream flowing out of a low hinterland among cabbage-tree palms, native cedars, the strange obdurate eucalyptus trees of a type which ... occurred nowhere else in all creation.	The Playmaker (1987)
	Rudyard Kipling	1865–1936	Sydney . . . was populated by leisured multitudes all in their shirt-sleeves and all picnicking all the day. They volunteered that they were new and young, but would do wonderful things some day.	Something of Myself (1937)
	Ray Lawler	1921–2024	How about that, Roo? We've been goin' to the same places for so long and doin' the same things that we've started to run ourselves into the ground . . . And there's a whole bloody country out there – wide open before us.	Summer of the Seventeenth Doll (1955)
	D.H. Lawrence	1885–1930	Australia has a marvellous sky and air and blue clarity and a hoary sort of land beneath is, like a Sleeping Princess on whom the dust of ages has settled. Wonder if she'll ever get up.	Letter from D. H. Lawrence (1922)
	Henry Lawson	1867–1922	And of afternoons in cities, when the rain is on the land, Visions come to me of Sweeney with his bottle in his hand, With the stormy night behind him, and the pub verandah-post - And I wonder why he haunts me more than any other ghost.	Sweeney (1893)
	Jack London	1876–1916	I would rather be ashes than dust, a spark burnt out in a brilliant blaze, than be stifled in dry rot . . . For man's chief purpose is to live, not to exist; I shall not waste my days trying to prolong them; I shall use my time.	South Sea Tales (1911)
	Colleen McCullough *	1937–2015	The bird with the thorn in its breast, it follows and immutable law; it is driven by it knows not what to impale itself, and die singing ... But we, when we put the thorns in our breasts, we know. We understand. And still we do it. Still we do it.	The Thorn Birds (1977)
	Dorothea Mackellar	1885–1968	I love a sunburnt country, A land of sweeping plains, Of ragged mountain ranges, Of droughts and flooding rains. I love her far horizons, I love her jewel-sea, Her beauty and her terror - The wide brown land for me!	My Country (1911)
	David Malouf	1934–	Australia is still revealing itself to us. We oughtn't to close off possibilities by declaring too early what we have already become.	"Lugarno Postscript", Notes and Furphies (1979)
	James A. Michener	1907–1997	Mankind was destined to live on the edge of perpetual disaster. We are mankind because we survive. We do it in a half-assed way, but we do it.	Chesapeake (1978)
	Oodgeroo Noonuccal	1920–1993	I could tell you of the heartbreak, hatred blind, I could tell of crimes that shape mankind, Of brutal wrongs and deeds malign, Of rape and murder, son of mine; But I'll tell instead of brave and fine When lives of black and white entwine. And men in brotherhood combine - This would I tell you, son of mine.	Son of Mine (1964)
	Ruth Park	1917–2010	To walk into the Opera House is to walk inside a sculpture, or perhaps a seashell, maybe an intricate, half-translucent nautilus. Morphology and the computers have composed a world of strange breathless shapes, vast, individual, quite unlike any other architecture.	The Companion Guide to Sydney (1973)
	A.B. ‘Banjo’ Paterson	1864–1941	It's grand to be an unemployed And lie in the Domain, And wake up every second day - And go to sleep again.	It's Grand (1902)
	Henry Handel Richardson	1870–1946	No one is less lenient towards romantic longings than he who has suffered disappointment in them, who has failed to transmute them into reality.	Maurice Guest (1908)
	Nevil Shute	1899–1960	"It's a funny thing", Jean said. "You go to a new country, and you expect everything to be different, and then you find there's such a lot that stays the same".	A Town Like Alice (1950)
	Kenneth Slessor	1901–1971	The red globes of light, the liquor-green, The pulsing arrows and the running fire Spilt on the stones, go deeper than the stream; You find this ugly, I find it lovely. Ghost's trousers, like the dangle of hung men, In pawnshop windows, bumping knee by knee, But none inside to suffer or condemn You find this ugly, I find it lovely.	William Street (1939)
	Christina Stead	1902–1983	This land was last discovered; why? A ghost land, this continent of mystery . . . Its heart is made of salt; it suddenly oozes from its burning pores, gold which will destroy men in greed, but not water to give them drink.	Seven Poor Men of Sydney (1934)
	Robert Louis Stevenson	1850–1894	... there is material for a dozen buccaneering stories to be picked up in the hotels at Circular Quay.	Robert Louis Stevenson, His Association With Australia – Mackaness (1935)
	Douglas Stewart	1913–1985	Australia's the violent country; the earth itself Suffers, cries out in anger against the sunlight From the cracked lips of the plains ... I have come to understand it in love and pity; Not horror now; I understand the Kellys.	Ned Kelly (1943)
	Watkin Tench *	1758–1833	The wind was now fair, the sky serene ... the temperature of the air delightfully pleasant: joy sparkled in every countenance, and congratulations issued from every mouth. Ithaca itself was scarcely more longed for by Ulysses, than Botany Bay by the adventurers who had traversed so many thousand miles to take possession of it.	A Narrative of the Expedition to Botany Bay (1789)
	Kylie Tennant	1912–1988	To be born is to be lucky. Later, life may prove a failure or a success, depending on the outlook of whoever is living it; but that life is there should be a matter of congratulation daily renewed. So many find life a slender chance ...	Ride On Stranger (1943)
	P. L. Travers *	1899–1996	Then the shape, tossed and bent under the wind, lifted the latch of the gate, and they could see that it belonged to a woman, who was holding her hat on with one hand and carrying a bag in the other.	Mary Poppins (1934)
	Anthony Trollope	1815–1882	The idea that Englishmen ... are made of paste, whereas the Australian, native or thoroughly acclimatized, is steel all through, I found to be universal.	Australia and New Zealand (1873)
	Ethel Turner	1872–1958	In Australia a model child is – I say it not without thankfulness – an unknown quantity . . . There is a lurking sparkle of joyousness and rebellion and mischief in nature here, and therefore in children.	Seven Little Australians (1894)
	Mark Twain	1835–1910	Australian history is almost always picturesque, indeed it is so curious and strange, that it is itself the chiefest novelty the country has to offer. It does not read like history but like the most beautiful lies. And all of a fresh sort, not mouldy old stale ones. It is full of surprises, and adventures and incongruities, and incredibilities, but they are all true, they all happened.	Following the Equator (1897)
	Morris West	1916–1999	... I claim No private lien on the truth, only A liberty to seek it, prove it in debate, And to be wrong a thousand times to reach A single rightness ...	The Heretic (1969)
	Patrick White	1912–1990	When man is truly humbled, when he has learnt that he is not God, then he is nearest to becoming so. In the end, he may ascend.	Voss (1957)
	David Williamson	1942–	In Melbourne, all views are equally depressing, so there's no point in having one. ... No one in Sydney ever wastes time debating the meaning of life – it's getting yourself a water frontage. People devote a lifetime to the quest.	Emerald City (1987)
	Judith Wright	1915–2000	I am born of the conquerors, you of the persecuted. Raped by rum and an alien law, progress and economics. are you and I and a once-loved land peopled by tribes and trees; doomed by traders and stock exchanges, bought by faceless strangers.	Two Dreamtimes (1973)
	Patricia Wrightson *	1921–2010	And something else lives in the swamp: something sly and secret, half as old as the mountain. On a still day you may hear it chuckle.	The Nargun and the Stars (1973)
