= Clive James =

Australian writer and broadcaster (1939–2019)

Clive James AO CBE FRSL
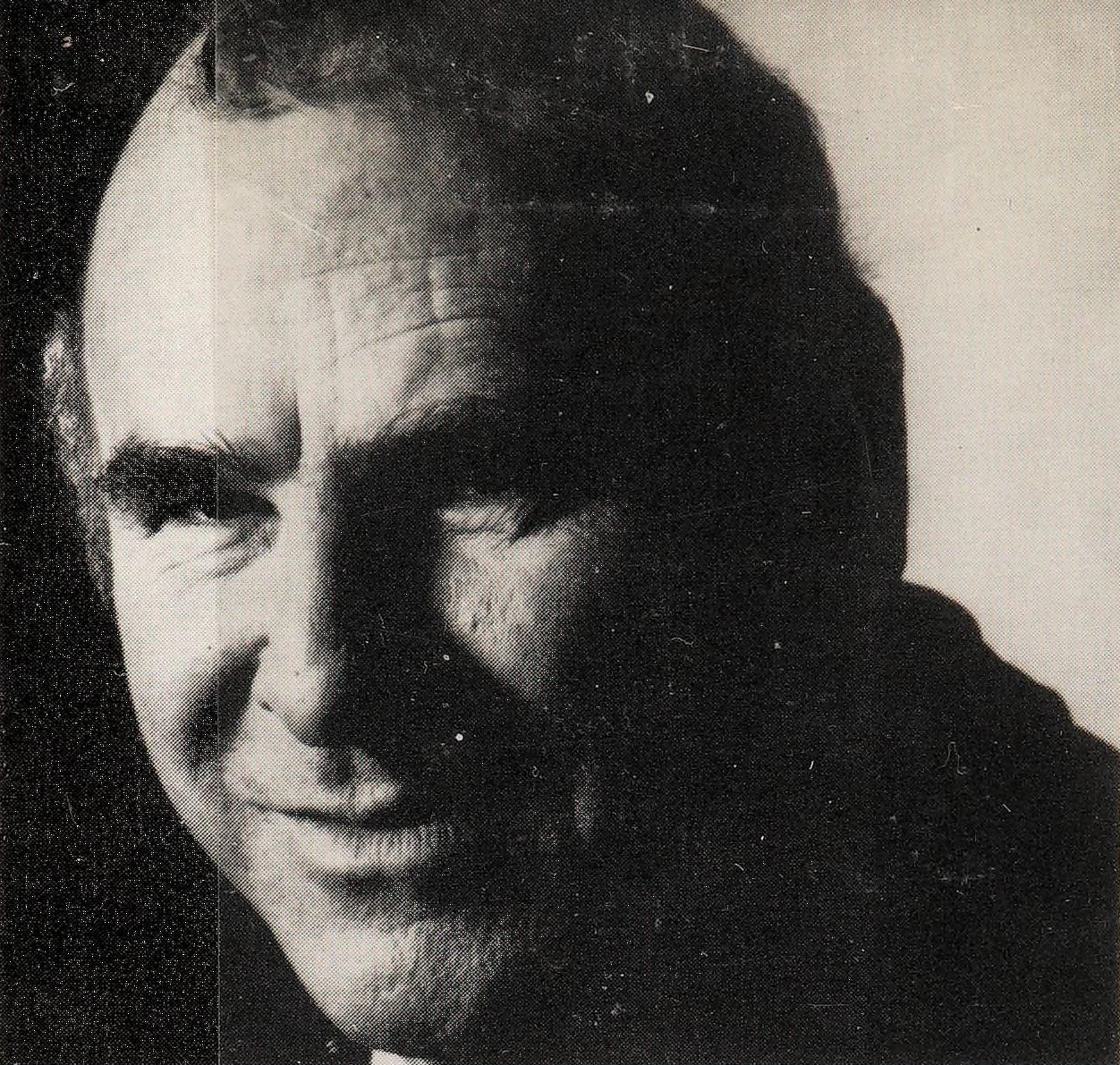
- James in 1986
- Born: Vivian Leopold James; 7 October 1939; Kogarah, New South Wales, Australia
- Died: 24 November 2019 (aged 80); Cambridge, Cambridgeshire, England
- Education: University of Sydney; Pembroke College, Cambridge
- Occupations: Author; essayist; poet; broadcaster
- Spouse: Prudence Shaw (m. 1968)
- Children: 2 (including Claerwen James)
- Writing career
- Notable works: Unreliable Memoirs; Cultural Amnesia
- Notable awards: Philip Hodgins Memorial Medal for Literature
- Website: clivejames.com

Clive James AO CBE FRSL (born Vivian Leopold James; 7 October 1939 – 24 November 2019) was an Australian critic, journalist, broadcaster, writer and lyricist who lived and worked in the United Kingdom from 1962 until his death in 2019. He began his career specialising in literary criticism before becoming television critic for The Observer in 1972, where he made his name for his wry, deadpan humour.

During this period, he earned an independent reputation as a poet and satirist. He achieved mainstream success in the UK first as a writer for television, and eventually as the lead in his own programmes, including ...on Television.

== Early life ==
James was born Vivian Leopold James in Kogarah, a southern suburb of Sydney. He was allowed to change his name as a child because "after Vivien Leigh played Scarlett O'Hara the name became irrevocably a girl's name no matter how you spelled it". He chose "Clive", the name of Tyrone Power's character in the 1942 film This Above All.

James' father, Albert Arthur James, was taken prisoner by the Japanese during World War II. Although he survived the prisoner-of-war camp, he died when the American B-24 carrying him and other freed Allied POWs ran into the tail of a typhoon en route from Okinawa to Manila, and crashed into the mountains of southeastern Taiwan. He was buried at Sai Wan War Cemetery in Hong Kong. James would later state that his life's works originated in his father's death.

James, an only child, was brought up by his mother (Minora May, née Darke), a factory worker, in the Sydney suburbs of Kogarah and Jannali, living some years with his English maternal grandfather.

He was educated at Sydney Technical High School (despite winning a bursary award to Sydney Boys High School) and the University of Sydney, where he read English and Psychology from 1957 to 1960, and became associated with the Sydney Push, a libertarian intellectual subculture. At university, he contributed to the student newspaper, Honi Soit and directed the annual students' union revue. He graduated with a Bachelor of Arts with Honours in English in 1961. After graduation, James worked for a year as an assistant editor for the magazine page at The Sydney Morning Herald.

In 1962, James emigrated to Britain, which became his home for the rest of his life. During his first three years in London, he shared a flat with the Australian film director Bruce Beresford (disguised as "Dave Dalziel" in the first three volumes of James's memoirs), was a neighbour of Australian artist Brett Whiteley, became acquainted with Barry Humphries (disguised as "Bruce Jennings") and had a variety of occasionally disastrous short-term jobs: sheet metal worker, library assistant, photo archivist and market researcher. During one summer holiday, he worked as a circus roustabout to save enough money to travel to Italy.

In 1964, James gained a place at Pembroke College, Cambridge, to read English literature. Whilst there, he contributed to all the undergraduate periodicals, was a member and later President of the Cambridge Footlights, and appeared on University Challenge as captain of the Pembroke team, beating St Hilda's College, Oxford, but (according to him) losing to Balliol on the last question in a tied game. His contemporaries at Cambridge included Germaine Greer (known as "Romaine Rand" in the first three volumes of his memoirs), Simon Schama and Eric Idle. Having, he claimed, scrupulously avoided reading any of the course material (but having read widely otherwise in English and foreign literature), James graduated with a 2:1—better than he had expected—and began a PhD thesis on Percy Bysshe Shelley.

== Career ==
=== Critic and essayist ===
James became the television critic for The Observer in 1972, remaining in the role until 1982. Mark Lawson described a James review as "so funny it was dangerous to read while holding a hot drink". He was at times merciless and selections from the column were published in three books – Visions Before Midnight, The Crystal Bucket and Glued to the Box – and finally in a compendium, On Television. He wrote literary criticism for newspapers, magazines and periodicals in Britain, Australia and the United States, including, among many others, the Australian Book Review, The Monthly, The Atlantic, The New York Review of Books, The Liberal and The Times Literary Supplement. John Gross included James's essay "A Blizzard of Tiny Kisses" in the Oxford Book of Essays (1992, 1999).

The Metropolitan Critic (1974), his first collection of literary criticism, was followed by At the Pillars of Hercules (1979), From the Land of Shadows (1982), Snakecharmers in Texas (1988), The Dreaming Swimmer (1992), Even As We Speak (2001), The Meaning of Recognition (2005) and Cultural Amnesia (2007), a collection of miniature intellectual biographies of over 100 significant figures in modern culture, history and politics. A defence of humanism, liberal democracy and literary clarity, the book was listed among the best of 2007 by The Village Voice. Another volume of essays, The Revolt of the Pendulum, was published in June 2009. He also published Flying Visits, a collection of travel writing for The Observer. Until mid-2014, he wrote the weekly television critique page in the "Review" section of the Saturday edition of The Daily Telegraph.

=== Poet and lyricist ===
James published several books of poetry, including Poem of the Year (1983), a verse-diary; Other Passports: Poems 1958–1985, a first collection and The Book of My Enemy (2003), a volume that takes its title from his poem "The Book of My Enemy Has Been Remaindered".

He published four mock-heroic poems: The Fate of Felicity Fark in the Land of the Media: a moral poem (1975), Peregrine Prykke's Pilgrimage Through the London Literary World (1976), Britannia Bright's Bewilderment in the Wilderness of Westminster (1976) and Charles Charming's Challenges on the Pathway to the Throne (1981), and one long autobiographical epic, The River in the Sky (2018). During the 1970s he also collaborated on six albums of songs with Pete Atkin and one album with Julie Covington:

- Beware of the Beautiful Stranger (1970)
- The Beautiful Changes (1971) with Julie Covington
- Driving Through Mythical America (1971)
- A King at Nightfall (1973)
- The Road of Silk (1974)
- Secret Drinker (1975)
- Live Libel (1975)

Atkin and James toured together to promote both the final album, a "contractual obligation" collection consisting of parodies and humour numbers written over the years, and James's own Felicity Fark epic poem. James wrote the album sleeve notes, which mostly linked the songs with thinly disguised jibes at popular artists and trends. On stage James both read from his poem, and introduced the album songs. Despite the success of the tour, there were no more recordings by Atkin, who pursued other opportunities and eventually became a BBC radio producer.

A revival of interest in the songs in the late 1990s, triggered largely by the creation by Steve Birkill of an Internet mailing list "Midnight Voices" in 1997, led to the reissue of the six albums on CD between 1997 and 2001, as well as live performances by the pair. A double album of previously unrecorded songs written in the seventies and entitled The Lakeside Sessions: Volumes 1 and 2 was released in 2002 and Winter Spring, an album of new material written by James and Atkin was released in 2003. This was followed by Midnight Voices, an album of remakes of the best Atkin/James songs from the early albums, and, in 2015, by The Colours of the Night, which included several newly completed songs.

James acknowledged the importance of the Midnight Voices group in bringing to wider attention the lyric-writing aspect of his career. He wrote in November 1997, "That one of the midnight voices of my own fate should be the music of Pete Atkin continues to rank high among the blessings of my life".

In 2013, he issued his translation of Dante's Divine Comedy. The work, adopting quatrains to translate the original's terza rima, was well received by Australian critics. Writing for The New York Times, Joseph Luzzi thought it often failed to capture the more dramatic moments of the Inferno, but that it was more successful where Dante slows down, in the more theological and deliberative cantos of the Purgatorio and Paradiso.

=== Novelist and memoirist ===
In 1980 James published his first book of autobiography, Unreliable Memoirs, which recounted his early life in Australia and extended to over 100 reprintings. It was followed by four other volumes of autobiography: Falling Towards England (1985), which covered his London years; May Week Was in June (1990), which dealt with his time at Cambridge; North Face of Soho (2006); and The Blaze of Obscurity (2009), concerning his subsequent career as a television presenter. An omnibus edition of the first three volumes was published under the generic title of Always Unreliable. James also wrote four novels: Brilliant Creatures (1983); The Remake (1987); Brrm! Brrm! (1991), published in the United States as The Man from Japan; and The Silver Castle (1996).

In 1999, John Gross included an excerpt from Unreliable Memoirs in The New Oxford Book of English Prose. John Carey chose Unreliable Memoirs as one of the 50 most enjoyable books of the 20th century in his book Pure Pleasure (2000).

=== Television ===
James developed his television career as a guest commentator on various shows, including as an occasional co-presenter with Tony Wilson on the first series of So It Goes, the Granada Television pop music show. On the show when the Sex Pistols made their TV debut, James commented: "During the recording, the task of keeping the little bastards under control was given to me. With the aid of a radio microphone, I was able to shout them down, but it was a near thing ... they attacked everything around them and had difficulty in being polite even to each other."

James subsequently hosted the ITV show Clive James on Television, in which he showcased unusual or (often unintentionally) amusing television programmes from around the world, notably the Japanese TV show Endurance. After his move to the BBC in 1988, he hosted a similarly formatted programme called Saturday Night Clive (1989–1991), which began on BBC2 but was popular enough to move to BBC1 in 1991. It returned in 1994 on Sunday nights, under the title Sunday Night Clive.

In 1995 he set up Watchmaker Productions to produce The Clive James Show for ITV, and a subsequent series launched the British career of singer and comedian Margarita Pracatan. James hosted one of the early chat shows on Channel 4 and fronted the BBC's Review of the Year programmes in the late 1980s (Clive James on the '80s) and 1990s (Clive James on the '90s), which formed part of the channel's New Year's Eve celebrations.

In the mid-1980s, James featured in a travel programme called Clive James in... (beginning with Clive James Live in Las Vegas) for LWT (now ITV) and later switched to the BBC, where he continued producing travel programmes, this time called Clive James's Postcard from... (beginning with Clive James's Postcard from Miami) – these also eventually transferred to ITV. He was also one of the original team of presenters of the BBC's The Late Show, hosting a round-table discussion on Friday nights.

His major documentary series Fame in the 20th Century (1993) was broadcast in the United Kingdom by the BBC, in Australia by the ABC and in the United States by the PBS network. This series dealt with the concept of "fame" in the 20th century, following over a course of eight episodes (each one chronologically and roughly devoted to one decade of the century, from the 1900s to the 1980s) discussions about world-famous people of the 20th century. Through the use of film footage, James presented a history of "fame" which explored its growth to today's global proportions. In his closing monologue he remarked, "Achievement without fame can be a rewarding life, while fame without achievement is no life at all."

A fan of motor racing, James presented the 1982, 1984 and 1986 official Formula One season review videos produced by the Formula One Constructors Association (FOCA). He attended most F1 races during the 1980s and was a friend of former FOCA boss Bernie Ecclestone. He also presented The Clive James Formula 1 Show for ITV to coincide with their Formula One coverage in 1997.

=== Radio ===
In 2007, James started presenting the BBC Radio 4 series A Point of View, with transcripts appearing in the "Magazine" section of BBC News Online. In this programme James discussed various issues with a slightly humorous slant. Topics covered included media portrayal of torture, young black role models and corporate rebranding. Three of James's broadcasts in 2007 were shortlisted for the 2008 Orwell Prize.

In October 2009, James read a radio version of his book The Blaze of Obscurity on BBC Radio 4's Book of the Week programme. In December 2009, James talked about the P-51 Mustang and other American fighter aircraft of World War II in The Museum of Curiosity on BBC Radio 4.

In May 2011, the BBC published a new podcast, A Point of View: Clive James, which features all sixty A Point of View programmes presented by James between 2007 and 2009.

He posted vlog conversations from his internet show Talking in the Library, including conversations with Ian McEwan, Cate Blanchett, Julian Barnes, Jonathan Miller and Terry Gilliam. In addition to the poetry and prose of James himself, the site featured the works of other literary figures such as Les Murray and Michael Frayn, as well as the works of painters, sculptors and photographers such as John Olsen and Jeffrey Smart.

=== Theatre ===
In 2008 James performed in two eponymous shows at the Edinburgh Festival Fringe: Clive James in Conversation and Clive James in the Evening. He took the latter show on a limited tour of the UK in 2009.

== Honours ==
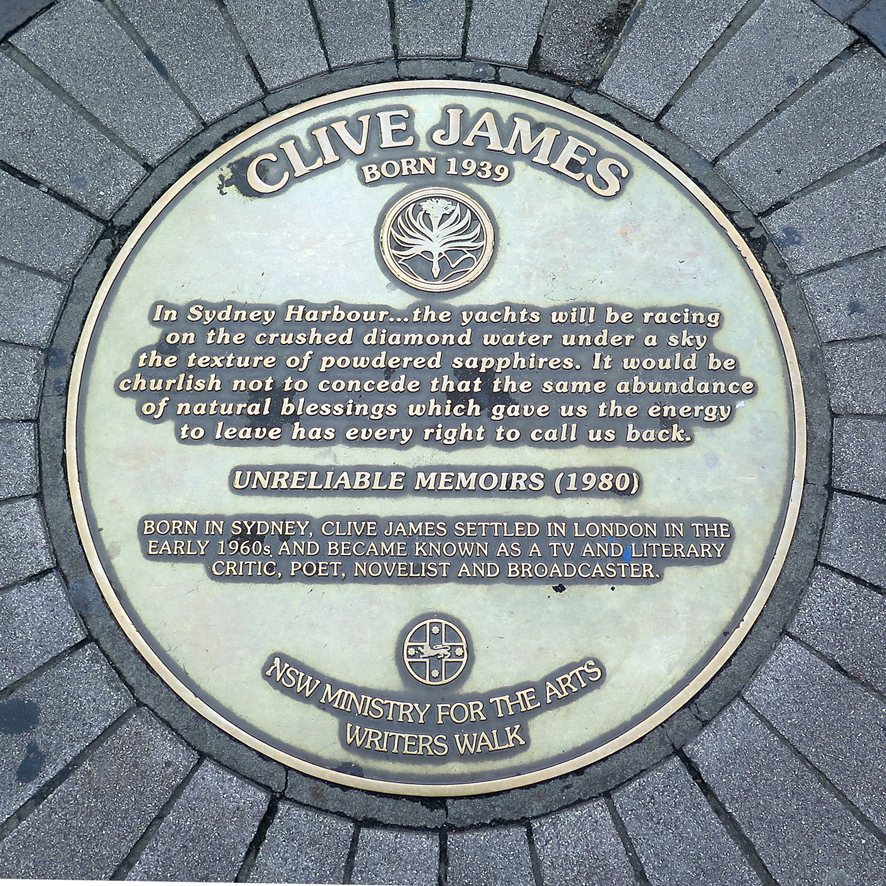
James's plaque on the Sydney Writers Walk

In 1992, James was made a Member of the Order of Australia (AM). This was enhanced to Officer level (AO) in the 2013 Australia Day Honours. James was appointed Commander of the Order of the British Empire (CBE) in the 2012 New Year Honours for services to literature and the media. In 2003 he was awarded the Philip Hodgins Memorial Medal for Literature. He received honorary doctorates from the universities of Sydney and East Anglia. In April 2008, James was awarded a Special Award for Writing and Broadcasting by the judges of the Orwell Prize.

He was elected a fellow of the Royal Society of Literature in 2010. He was an honorary fellow of Pembroke College, Cambridge (his alma mater). In the 2015 BAFTAs, James received a special award honouring his 50-year career. In 2014, he was awarded the President's Medal by the British Academy.

James is celebrated with a plaque on the Sydney Writers Walk on Circular Quay. It includes an excerpt on Sydney Harbour from Unreliable Memoirs.

== Political views ==
James's political views were prominent in much of his later writing. While critical of communism for its tendency towards totalitarianism, he identified with the left for much of his life. In a 2006 interview in The Sunday Times, James said of himself: "I was brought up on the proletarian left, and I remain there. The fair go for the workers is fundamental, and I don't believe the free market has a mind." In a speech given in 1991, he criticised privatisation, saying: "The idea that Britain's broadcasting system—for all its drawbacks one of the country's greatest institutions—was bound to be improved by being subjected to the conditions of a free market: there was no difficulty in recognising that notion as politically illiterate. But for some reason people did have difficulty in realising that it was economically illiterate too." In 2001, James identified as a liberal social democrat.

His later views were more commonly aligned with the political right. James strongly supported the 2003 invasion of Iraq, saying in 2007 that "the war only lasted a few days" and that the continuing conflict in Iraq was "the Iraq peace". He also wrote that it was "official policy to rape a woman in front of her family" during Saddam Hussein's regime and that women have enjoyed more rights since the invasion. In 2017, James contributed a chapter to a book on climate change published by the Institute of Public Affairs, advocating climate denialism.

Describing religions as "advertising agencies for a product that doesn't exist", James was an atheist and saw it as the default and obvious position. He was also a patron of the Burma Campaign UK, an organisation that campaigns for human rights and democracy in Burma.

== Personal life ==
In 1968, at Cambridge, James married Prudence A. "Prue" Shaw, also Australian, a graduate of the University of Sydney, the University of Florence and Somerville College, Oxford. Shaw taught Italian language and literature at the University of Cambridge, and at University College London where, since retirement in 2003, she has been emerita reader in Italian studies. She is the author of Reading Dante: From Here to Eternity and Dante: The Essential Commedia.

James and Shaw had two daughters, one of whom is the artist Claerwen James. In April 2012, the Australian Channel Nine programme A Current Affair ran an item in which the former model Leanne Edelsten admitted to an eight-year affair with James beginning in 2004. Shaw evicted her husband from the family home following the revelation. Before this, for most of his working life, James divided his time between a converted warehouse flat in London and the family home in Cambridge.

After the death of Diana, Princess of Wales, James wrote a piece for The New Yorker entitled "Requiem", recording his overwhelming grief. From then he mainly declined to comment about their friendship, apart from some remarks in his fifth volume of memoirs, Blaze of Obscurity.

James was able to read, with varying fluency, French, German, Italian, Spanish, Russian and Japanese. A tango enthusiast, he travelled to Buenos Aires for dance lessons and had a dance floor in his house.

James was a fan of the St George Dragons and wrote admiringly of Rugby League Immortal Reg Gasnier who was a schoolmate at Sydney Technical High School. He guest presented one episode of The Footy Show in 2005.

== Health and death ==
For much of his life, James was a heavy drinker and smoker. At various times he wrote of attempts, intermittently successful, to give up drinking and smoking. He smoked 80 cigarettes a day for a number of years before giving up in 2005. Prior to that, he had been successful in giving up smoking for 13 years, beginning in his early 30s. He recorded in May Week Was in June his habit of filling a hubcap ashtray daily.

In April 2011, after media speculation that he had suffered kidney failure, James confirmed in June 2012 that B-cell chronic lymphocytic leukemia "had beaten him" and that he was "near the end". He said that he had also been diagnosed with emphysema and kidney failure in early 2010.

On 3 September 2013, an interview with journalist Kerry O'Brien, Clive James: The Kid from Kogarah, was broadcast by the Australian Broadcasting Corporation. The interview was filmed in the library of his old college at Cambridge University. In the extended interview, James discussed his illness and confronting mortality. He wrote the poem "Japanese Maple" which was published in The New Yorker in 2014 and described as his "farewell poem". The New York Times called it "a poignant meditation on his impending death".

In a BBC interview with Charlie Stayt, broadcast on 31 March 2015, James described himself as "near to death but thankful for life". In October 2015, he admitted to feeling "embarrassment" at still being alive thanks to experimental drug treatment. Until June 2017, he wrote a weekly column for The Guardian entitled "Reports of My Death...". James died at his home in Cambridge on 24 November 2019.

== Bibliography ==
=== Memoir ===
- Unreliable Memoirs. Jonathan Cape. 1980.
- Falling Towards England. Jonathan Cape. 1985.
- May Week was in June. Jonathan Cape. 1990.
- North Face of Soho. Picador. 2006. ISBN 978-0-330-48128-1.
- The Blaze of Obscurity. Picador. 2009. ISBN 978-0-330-45736-1.

=== Criticism ===
- The Metropolitan Critic. Faber and Faber. 1974. ISBN 978-0-224-04241-3.
  - New edition: The Metropolitan Critic: Non-fiction 1968–1973. Jonathan Cape. 1994. ISBN 978-1-4472-6790-4.
- Visions Before Midnight: Television Criticism from the Observer 1972–76. Jonathan Cape. 1977. ISBN 0-224-01386-6.
- At the Pillars of Hercules: Non-fiction 1973–1977. Faber and Faber. 1979. ISBN 978-0-330-37214-5.
- First Reactions: Critical Essays 1968–79. Knopf. 1980. ISBN 978-0-394-51233-4. (US collection)
- The Crystal Bucket: Television Criticism from the Observer 1976–79. Jonathan Cape. 1981. ISBN 978-0-330-26745-8.
- From the Land of Shadows. Jonathan Cape. 1982. ISBN 978-0-330-26994-0. (Essays 1977–81)
- Glued to the Box: Television Criticism from the Observer 1979–82. Jonathan Cape. 1983. ISBN 978-0-224-02066-4.
- Snakecharmers in Texas: Essays 1980–87. Jonathan Cape. 1988. ISBN 978-0-330-30580-8.
- Clive James on Television. Picador. 1991. (Collects Visions Before Midnight, The Crystal Bucket, and Glued to the Box)
- The Dreaming Swimmer: Non-fiction 1987–1992. Jonathan Cape. 1992. ISBN 978-0-330-33121-0.
- Fame in the 20th Century. BBC Books. 1993. ISBN 978-0-563-36274-6. (Book of the TV series)
- Even As We Speak: New Essays 1993–2001. Picador. 2001. ISBN 978-0-330-48176-2.
- Reliable Essays: The Best of Clive James. Picador. 2001. ISBN 978-0-330-48129-8.
- As of This Writing: The Essential Essays, 1968–2002. W. W. Norton & Company. 2003. ISBN 978-0-393-05180-3. (US collection)
  - Reissue: Cultural Cohesion: The Essential Essays, 1968–2002. W. W. Norton & Company. 2013. ISBN 978-0-393-34636-7.
- The Meaning of Recognition: New Essays 2001–2005. Picador. 2005.
- Cultural Amnesia: Necessary Memories from History and the Arts. W. W. Norton & Company. 2007. ISBN 978-0-393-06116-1.
- The Revolt of the Pendulum: Essays 2005–2008. Picador. 2009. ISBN 978-0-330-45739-2.
- A Point of View. Picador. 2011. ISBN 978-0-330-53438-3. (Book of the radio series)
- Poetry Notebook: 2006–2014. Picador. 2014. ISBN 978-1-4472-6910-6.
- Latest Readings. Yale University Press. 2015. ISBN 978-0-300-22355-2.
- Play All: A Bingewatcher's Notebook. Yale University Press. 2016. ISBN 978-0-300-22970-7.
- Somewhere Becoming Rain: Collected Writings on Philip Larkin. Picador. 2019. ISBN 978-1-5290-2882-9.

=== Travel ===
- Flying Visits: Postcards from the Observer 1976–83. Jonathan Cape. 1984. ISBN 978-0-330-28839-2.

=== Novels ===
- Brilliant Creatures. Jonathan Cape. 1983. ISBN 978-0-330-28343-4.
- The Remake. Jonathan Cape. 1987. ISBN 978-0-330-30374-3.
- Brrm! Brrm! (or The Man from Japan, or Perfume at Anchorage). Jonathan Cape. 1991. ISBN 978-0-330-32548-6. (US title: The Man from Japan)
- The Silver Castle. Jonathan Cape. 1996. ISBN 978-0-224-04384-7.

=== Poetry ===
==== Poetry collections ====
- Fan-mail: Seven Verse Letters. Faber and Faber. 1977. ISBN 978-0-571-11058-2.
- Other Passports: Poems 1958–1985. Jonathan Cape. 1986. ISBN 978-0-330-30179-4.
- The Book of My Enemy: Collected Verse 1958–2003. Picador. 2003. ISBN 978-0-330-42004-4.
- Angels Over Elsinore: Collected Verse 2003–2008. Picador. 2008. ISBN 978-0-330-45740-8.
- Opal Sunset: Selected Poems 1958–2008. W.W. Norton & Co. 2008. ISBN 978-0-393-06707-1.
- Nefertiti in the Flak Tower: Collected Verse 2008–2011. Picador. 2012. ISBN 978-1-447-20700-9.
- Sentenced to Life: Poems 2011–2014. Picador. 2015. ISBN 978-1-4472-8405-5.
- Collected Poems 1958–2015. Picador. 2016. ISBN 978-1-63149-247-1.
- Injury Time. Picador. 2017. ISBN 978-1-5098-5298-7.
- The Light As It Grows Dark: The Last Poems. Picador. 2026. ISBN 978-1-037-40647-8.

==== Epic poems ====
- The Fate of Felicity Fark in the Land of the Media. Jonathan Cape. 1975. ISBN 978-0-224-01185-3.
- Peregrine Prykke's Pilgrimage through the London Literary World. Jonathan Cape. 1976.
- Britannia Bright's Bewilderment in the Wilderness of Westminster. Jonathan Cape. 1976. ISBN 978-0-224-01319-2.
- Charles Charming's Challenges on the Pathway to the Throne. Jonathan Cape. 1981. ISBN 978-0-224-01954-5.
- Poem of the Year. Jonathan Cape. 1983. ISBN 978-0-224-02961-2.
- Gate of Lilacs: A Verse Commentary on Proust. Picador. 2016. ISBN 978-1-5098-1235-6.
- The River in the Sky. Picador. 2018. ISBN 978-1-5098-8723-1.

==== Translation ====
- Dante (2013). The Divine Comedy: A new verse translation by Clive James. Liveright. ISBN 978-0-87140-741-2.

==== Anthology ====
- The Fire of Joy: Roughly 80 Poems to Get by Heart and Say Aloud. Picador. 2020. ISBN 978-1-52904-208-5.

==== List of selected poems ====
Title	Year	First published	Reprinted/collected
The book of my enemy has been remaindered	1983	James, Clive (2 June 1983). "The book of my enemy has been remaindered". The London Review of Books. 5 (10).	
Beachmaster	2009	James, Clive (April 2009). "Beachmaster". The Monthly.	
Early to bed	2013	James, Clive (April 2013). "Early to bed". Australian Book Review. 350: 25.	
Leçons de ténèbres	2013	James, Clive (3 June 2013). "Leçons de ténèbres". The New Yorker. Vol. 89, no. 16. p. 64.	
Rounded with a sleep	2014	James, Clive (16 March 2015). "Rounded with a sleep". The Times Literary Supplement. 5810: 4.	
Star system	2015	James, Clive (16 March 2015). "Star system". The New Yorker. Vol. 91, no. 4. pp. 50–51.	
Visitation of the dove	2015	James, Clive (7 December 2015). "Visitation of the dove". The New Yorker. Vol. 91, no. 39. p. 50.	
Initial outlay	2016	James, Clive (January–February 2016). "Initial outlay". Quadrant. 60 (1–2): 9.	
I was proud of these hands once	2016	James, Clive (January–February 2016). "I was proud of these hands once". Quadrant. 60 (1–2): 49.	
Splinters from Shakespeare	2016	James, Clive (January–February 2016). "Splinters from Shakespeare". Quadrant. 60 (1–2): 49.	

== See also ==
- Clive James on Television
- Clive James's Postcard from...
