= Clive James's Postcard from... =

TV travel documentary series

- Genre: Travel documentary
- Written by: Clive James
- Starring: Clive James
- Country of origin: United Kingdom
- Original language: English
- No. of series: 9
- No. of episodes: 18

Production
- Running time: 50 minutes (BBC)
- Production companies: Watchmaker Productions (ITV); Carlton (ITV)

Original release
- Network: BBC1 (Series 1–6); ITV (Series 7–9)
- Release: 4 January 1989 – 19 September 1999

Clive James' Postcard from... (sometimes shortened to Postcard(s) from...) was a TV travel documentary series written and presented by Clive James, originally broadcast between 1989 and 1999. In each episode James visited a notable world city, exploring tourist hotspots and commenting on the city's appeal in his trademark wry comic style, as well as conducting interviews with famous inhabitants.

The first six series (1989-1995) were produced by the BBC, while the further 5 episodes (1996-1999) were produced by Watchmaker Productions (co-founded by James) for Carlton Television (ITV franchise). In the United States the show aired on PBS.

In a 1992 interview James said that Postcards was his most personal work. He had previously been a columnist for The Observer newspaper between 1976 and 1983, contributing travel diaries which were later compiled into the book Flying Visits.

Following James' death in November 2019, all 13 episodes of Postcards produced by the BBC were rebroadcast on BBC Four between January and March 2020 (not in chronological order).

== Episodes ==
In the first series (1989), James visited Rio de Janeiro, Chicago and Paris (where he interviewed Beatrice Dalle). In the second series (1990) he visited Miami, Florida, meeting Don Johnson and Gloria Estefan, while other episodes brought him to Rome, Shanghai and Los Angeles. In Rome James talked with Vittorio Mussolini and Leonard Bernstein, while in L.A. he met Dudley Moore and Kirstie Alley. The third series (1991) focused on Sydney and London, the two cities with which James was most associated during his life. Whilst in the latter, he talked with Michael Caine, Victoria Wood, Peter Cook and Terence Donovan. The fourth series (1993) brought James to Cairo, where he met Omar Sharif. In the fifth series (1994) he travelled to New York City (where he met Richard Price and Ivana Trump), while the sixth (1995) took him to Bombay and Berlin (where he interviewed German singer Meret Becker). In 1996 James went to Hong Kong (where he met Maggie Cheung, Chris Patten, Lord Lichfield and Kai Bong Chow). In 1998 he went to Las Vegas, the Melbourne Cup, and Mexico City. In the final episode in 1999 he visited Havana.

No.	Episode	First broadcast	Channel
Series 1
1	"Postcard from Rio"	4 January 1989	BBC1
2	"Postcard from Chicago"	11 January 1989	BBC1
3	"Postcard from Paris"	18 January 1989	BBC1
Series 2
4	"Postcard from Miami"	17 May 1990	BBC1
5	"Postcard from Rome"	24 May 1990	BBC1
6	"Postcard from Shanghai"	31 May 1990	BBC1
7	"Postcard from Los Angeles"	27 September 1990	BBC1
Series 3
8	"Postcard from Sydney"	30 May 1991	BBC1
9	"Postcard from London"	31 July 1991	BBC1
Series 4
10	"Postcard from Cairo"	21 November 1993	BBC1
Series 5
11	"Postcard from New York"	19 January 1994	BBC1
Series 6
12	"Postcard from Bombay"	21 February 1995	BBC1
13	"Postcard from Berlin"	7 March 1995	BBC1
Series 7
14	"Postcard from Hong Kong"	27 August 1996	ITV
15	"Postcard from the Melbourne Cup"	4 November 1996	ITV
16	"Postcard from Mexico City"	2 December 1996	ITV
Series 8
17	"Postcard from Las Vegas"	5 May 1998	ITV
Series 9
18	"Postcard from Havana"	19 September 1999	ITV

== Clive James in... ==
Not to be confused with the Postcard from… series, James had previously made three city-based documentaries under the Clive James in… title for London Weekend Television. A fourth was made in 1995 by Watchmaker Productions, his first travelogue since moving back to ITV from the BBC.

No.	Title	Original release date	Channel
1	"Clive James Live in Las Vegas"	25 July 1982	ITV
2	"Clive James in Dallas"	27 December 1985	ITV
3	"Clive James in Japan"	26 December 1987	ITV
4	"Clive James in Buenos Aires"	4 December 1995	ITV
