= Falling Towards England =

Falling Towards England is a memoir by Australian writer Clive James published in 1985 by Jonathan Cape. It was as sequel to James' 1980 work Unreliable Memoirs. The memoir starts with his arrival in England in 1963 as an Australian who had never seen snow.

A number of real people are mentioned in the memoir: they include filmmaker Bruce Beresford at one point shared accommodation with James.
