= Unreliable Memoirs =

1980 memoir by Clive James

- Author: Clive James
- Publisher: Jonathan Cape
- Publication date: 1980
- ISBN: 0224018256
- Followed by: Falling Towards England

Unreliable Memoirs is a memoir by Australian writer Clive James published in 1980 by Jonathan Cape The book was a bestseller, and the first of a series of autobiographical works.

It was followed by Falling Towards England, published in 1985, May Week was in June (1990), North Face of Soho (2006) and The Blaze of Obscurity (2009).

Unreliable Memoirs is also the title of an omnibus edition published in 1990 which included Falling Towards England and May Week Was in June in addition to the title memoir.

== Synopsis ==
This volume of James's autobiography follows his life from his early childhood in the Sydney suburb of Kogarah, through school and university until he sets sail for the United Kingdom in 1962.

== Critical reception ==
Writing in The Canberra Times John Pomeroy noted: "There is much goodwill and affection in these recollections and there is evidence of a painful audit of emotions and influences from his formative years. The book may be short of great names and events and lacking the strong narrative of My Brother Jack, but they will strike a chord for many of his generation."

In 2015 P. J. O'Rourke called the book "the best memoir in the world". He went on: "Unreliable Memoirs is written with a mastery of the honest and a down-the-hole understanding of its pitfalls. Honesty comes in various types and the best is exaggeration...Clive exaggerates to wonderfully honest effect. He sets to work with singular material, a combination of an exceptional young mind, an upbringing in the exotically named town of Kogarah, a pained childhood with his father, a Japanese prisoner of war, surviving only to die in a repatriation plane crash and his mother worn by worry and toil and, finally, tragedy. Then Clive, by a wild act of exaggeration, makes all this universal. He takes the yeast of his memory and plants it in the bread dough of ours."

== Publication history ==
After its original publication in 1980 in the UK by publisher Jonathan Cape it was later published as follows:

- Picador, UK, 1980 and 2015
- Knopf, USA, 1981
- W. W. Norton, USA, 2009
- Folio Society, UK, 2010

== See also ==
- 1980 in Australian literature
