= ...on Television =

British late-night television programme

- Also known as: Clive James on Television; Floyd on Television; Tarrant on TV; It's Clarkson on TV
- Genre: Comedy
- Starring: Clive James (1982–88, 1997–98); Keith Floyd (1989); Chris Tarrant (1990–96, 1998–2006); Jeremy Clarkson (2020–21)
- Country of origin: United Kingdom
- No. of series: 21

Production
- Running time: 30–60 minutes (including adverts)
- Production companies: LWT; (now branded ITV Productions); Watchmaker Productions/Carlton (1997–98); Expectation (2020–21)

Original release
- Network: ITV
- Release: 19 September 1982 – 5 October 2006
- Release: 25 December 2020 – 29 August 2021

Related
- Tarrant's Ten Years of Television; Tarrant on CCTV

...on Television or ...on TV, is a long-running late-night television programme on ITV. The programme, which was made first by LWT and then Granada Productions, featured a number of clips from unusual or (often unintentionally) amusing television programmes and commercials from around the world.

The show was first presented by TV critic and journalist Clive James between 1982 and 1988, followed by celebrity chef Keith Floyd in 1989. Chris Tarrant took over as presenter from 1990 to 1996, with James briefly returning in 1997. Tarrant resumed as presenter from 1998 until the show ended in 2006. On Christmas Day 2020, the show was revived for a one-off special with Jeremy Clarkson as host. Another episode with Clarkson aired in April 2021, with a series of three episodes being broadcast after Who Wants to Be a Millionaire? in July 2021.

== Early years ==
The show began in 1982, hosted by the Australian television critic and satirist Clive James. The series showed funny and bizarre clips from TV shows and adverts from around the world, most notably from the Far Eastern countries of Japan and Korea. The series popularised the Japanese show Endurance which followed numerous contestants as they underwent painful tasks around the world.

After James joined the BBC in 1988, celebrity chef Keith Floyd was brought in for a six-episode series in 1989 before Chris Tarrant took over in 1990.

== Later years ==
For its tenth anniversary in 1992, Tarrant presented a compilation series entitled Tarrant's Ten Years of Television (later 10 Years on TV), which showed clips from the past five series and specials. It also included extra footage that was deemed unsuitable for transmission in the original show.

In 1997, Clive James returned as host for two series, produced by Watchmaker Productions for Carlton Television, in 1997 and 1998.

=== Tarrant on TV ===
The show continued to show bizarre clips from all over the world. But they now often included nudity, strong language, and crude or dark humour. Examples include a Japanese crying contest, a Japanese contraception advert, a profane North Korean propaganda film, and an advert showing ping pong balls being fired from the bottom. Tarrant on TV also began to cover more violent and unusual programming such as the Jerry Springer Show or The Man Show. Additionally, many acclaimed public information films were shown from around the world, particularly road safety campaigns from the Transport Accident Commission of Australia and Land Transport New Zealand.

With a different presenter, the format was also altered to include a special guest. On 4 April 1992, Mel Brooks appeared on the show. The show's content focused on different types of humour in Sweden, America and Israel. However the celebrity guest format was dropped by LWT because it was deemed too expensive to pay for cinematic clips and a guest star each week.

The last series of Tarrant on TV was in 2005, with a special broadcast in October 2006. The theme tune between 1996 and 2006 was Syd Dale's "The Penthouse Suite".

=== It's Clarkson on TV ===
On Christmas Day 2020, a revival of the show was broadcast, with Jeremy Clarkson hosting a review of the year's television. A second episode was broadcast on 2 April 2021 with a series following in July 2021. Now produced for ITV by Expectation Entertainment, the series has moved away from featuring as many foreign television clips (such as Japanese game show Endurance) as its predecessors, with British dramas such as White House Farm, Quiz and Des critiqued alongside English-language shows on streaming services, such as Love is Blind and Selling Sunset.

== Transmissions ==
No full series was aired between 1985 and 1988, and in 1991, 1992, 1994 and 1997; however, special episodes were often broadcast.

=== Regular series ===
Series	Start date	End date	Host
1	19 September 1982	31 October 1982	Clive James
2	23 October 1983	4 December 1983	Clive James
3	28 October 1984	2 December 1984	Clive James
4	5 March 1989	16 April 1989	Keith Floyd
5	21 January 1990	25 February 1990	Chris Tarrant
6 (Tarrant's Ten Years of..)	13 February 1993	20 March 1993	Chris Tarrant
7 (10 Years on..)	19 March 1995	16 April 1995	Chris Tarrant
8	8 September 1996	13 October 1996	Chris Tarrant
9	4 January 1998	22 February 1998	Chris Tarrant
10	3 January 1999	21 March 1999	Chris Tarrant
11	4 January 2000	28 February 2000	Chris Tarrant
12	21 January 2001	18 March 2001	Chris Tarrant
13	3 May 2002	5 July 2002	Chris Tarrant
14	12 September 2002	7 November 2002	Chris Tarrant
15	2 January 2003	25 May 2003	Chris Tarrant
16	6 February 2004	22 March 2004	Chris Tarrant
17 (The Best of...)	10 June 2004	1 July 2004	Chris Tarrant
18	8 October 2004	23 November 2004	Chris Tarrant
19	30 May 2005	27 June 2005	Chris Tarrant

=== Revived series ===
Series	Start date	End date	Host
1	4 September 1997	16 October 1997	Clive James
2	11 November 1998	21 December 1998	Clive James

=== Specials ===
Hosted by Clive James:

- Special 1: 5 January 1986
- Special 2: 29 March 1986
- Special 3: 28 June 1986
- Special 4: 28 December 1986
- Special 5: 1 January 1987
- Special 6: 19 April 1987
- Special 7: 11 October 1987
- Special 8: 1 January 1988

Hosted by Chris Tarrant:

- Special 9: 30 December 1990
- Special 10: 4 January 1992
- Special 11: 4 April 1992
- Special 12: 11 July 1992
- Special 13: 26 September 1993
- Special 14 (Tarrant's Ten Years of..): 17 September 1994
- Special 15 (Tarrant's Ten Years of..): 24 September 1994
- Special 16: 27 December 1997 (Christmas special)
- Special 17: 10 May 1998 (Best of TV Series 9)
- Special 18: 16 May 1999 (Best of Series 10)
- Special 19: 7 May 2000 (Best of Series 11)
- Special 20: 25 March 2001 (Tarrant on CCTV)
- Special 21: 20 January 2002 (Tarrant on CCTV)
- Special 22: 7 July 2002 (Tarrant on CCTV)
- Special 23: 23 November 2002
- Special 24: 14 December 2002
- Special 25: 5 May 2003 (Tarrant on CCTV)
- Special 26: 4 September 2003
- Special 27: 23 October 2003
- Special 28: 7 November 2003
- Special 29: 24 December 2003
- Special 30: 13 May 2004 (Japan special)
- Special 31: 5 July 2004
- Special 32: 31 August 2004
- Special 33: 5 October 2006

Hosted by Jeremy Clarkson:

- Special 34: 25 December 2020
- Special 35: 2 April 2021

=== It's Clarkson on TV series ===
Series	Start date	End date	Host
1	10 July 2021	29 August 2021	Jeremy Clarkson

== See also ==
- Japandemonium – an ITV show featuring clips of modern Japanese shows in the style of Endurance and with a voice-over from Melvin Odoom.
- Paddy's TV Guide – a similar show made by ITV (with Paddy McGuinness) for Channel 4.
- Channel Hopping With Jon Richardson – a weird TV clips show on Comedy Central presented by Jon Richardson.
- Gogglebox - Channel 4
