= Claerwen James =

British painter (born 1970)

Claerwen Laura James (born October 1970) is a British painter.

== Early life ==
James is the daughter of the Australian journalist Clive James and his wife, the scholar Prudence Shaw. James studied zoology at the University of Oxford.

== Career ==
James specialises in portraiture, particularly of young people, painted from photographs rather than live sittings.

James began painting during her undergraduate studies. Following the completion of her academic studies, she decided to revert to her original passion for art and between 1999 and 2003 enrolled on a painting course at the Slade School of Art. Graduating in 2003, James gained a first-class degree, and was awarded the Melvill Nettleship Prize for Figure Composition. From 2003 to 2004 she continued her studies at the Prince's Drawing School after obtaining a graduate bursary. Her work is held in the permanent collection of the Scheringa Museum of Realist Art in Spanbroek, Netherlands.

In addition to her paintings, James produces prints, utilising techniques that include block-printing and hand-stencilled silk screening. She is one third of design partnership, Cambridge Imprint, where she has designed decorative patterns for the sleeves for Persephone Books, and collaborated with heritage shoe brand Grenson on a new printed design shoe.

== Bibliography ==
- Claerwen James [Catalogue of the exhibition held at Flowers 21 May– 26 June 2010] New York.
- Claerwen James [Catalogue of the exhibition held at Flowers 13 February– 16 March 2013] London.
