= Za Gaman =

Japanese reality competition program

Za Gaman (ザ・ガマン, lit. 'The Endurance') is a Japanese television program from the 1980s. It is not particularly well-known or remembered in Japan, but it became famous in other countries, particularly the United Kingdom. This is likely due to its appearance on the British television program Clive James on Television and subsequently Tarrant on TV, under the name Endurance.

The program was a version of an activity at Japanese universities, the gaman taikai or "endurance contest", where students try to outdo each other in withstanding unpleasant experiences. The TV program featured teams from universities, such as Keio University, who were subjected to various unpleasant ordeals, such as being buried up to the neck in sand or licked by reptiles. The person who endured the longest was declared the winner.

== Reaction and impact in the United Kingdom ==
Short segments of the program were used in the British television shows, which humorously examined television programs from around the world. Following Clive James on Television, clips from the now-defunct show were also used in the 1990s in Tarrant on TV. A very short-lived British version of the show was also created, hosted by Paul Ross, but it did not feature the extreme conditions of the original program. Only two series of the British version were produced for Challenge TV, which first aired from 1997 to 1998, and it saw little success.

The use of the clips on the Clive James show created controversy, with some Japanese people feeling that the show was unrepresentative, and some former British prisoners of war also complained about the contents. James went on to write a novel called Brrm! Brrm! with a Japanese lead character, Akira Suzuki, who was made fun of by his British friends using the word "endurance".

The program made the Guinness Book of World Records for "Most Extreme Game Show".

=== Endurance UK ===
After short segments of the now-defunct show were used in Clive James on Television and Tarrant on TV, the format was picked up by British television company Flextech, who were in the process of rebranding The Family Channel (originally based at TVS Television Centre in Maidstone) into a game show network called Challenge TV.

The short-lived British version of the show ran for two series (airing from 1997 to 1998) and was hosted by Paul Ross from a 'Japanese-styled' studio with 'Japanese' assistants Hoki and Koki (actually actors Peter Cocks and Stephen Taylor Woodrow, from TVS children's show What's Up Doc?, in yellowface). In series two, Tara O'Connor replaced Olivia Stranger as the host (the 'Gong Banger'), while Chris Sievey (previously seen as Frank Sidebottom on the TVS shows No. 73, Motormouth, and What's Up Doc?) joined as a 'Gimp man' character.

== See also ==
- Banzai – uses Japanese iconography as a base for the show
- I'm a Celebrity... Get Me Out of Here! – uses tasks similar to Za Gaman
- Japandemonium – an ITV show featuring clips of modern Japanese shows in the style of Za Gaman
- Ninja Warrior UK – based upon the format of a Japanese game show called Sasuke
- Ultra Quiz – a 1980s TVS/ITV elimination game show based on a Japanese format
