= Visions Before Midnight =

Book by Clive James

First edition (published by Jonathan Cape)

Visions Before Midnight is a selection of the television criticism written by Clive James during his first four years (1972–1976) as The Observer's weekly television critic. The selection begins with a piece on the 1972 Summer Olympics in Munich, and ends with a piece on the 1976 Summer Olympics in Montreal. It was first published in 1977. The title derives from Sir Thomas Browne: Dreams out of the ivory gate, and visions before midnight.

Before being contracted by Observer editor David Astor, James had written one piece per month on television for The Listener and its editor, Karl Miller, had been an important influence on James. He had allowed him to "write a column which eschewed solemnity so thoroughly that it courted the frivolous. Like Lichtenberg Karl Miller appreciated the kind of joke that unveils a problem: if your gags had a serious reason for being there, they stayed in." James explains in the preface: "Television was a natural part of my life. I loved watching it and I loved being on it. The second passion has since somewhat faded, but the first remains strong, and was very powerful at the time. I watched just about everything, including the junk. The screen teemed with unsummable activity. It was full of visions, legends, myths, fables. T.V was scarcely something you could feel superior to. It was too various. What I had to offer was negative capability, a capability for submission to the medium. I was the first to submit myself to Alastair Burnet and find him fascinating. No critic before me had ever regarded David Vine as a reason for switching the set on."

In the preface James says that the idea of publishing a selection of his television criticism had been in his mind since speaking with Kenneth Tynan at a reception at the Garrick Club. Tynan had said he hoped James would publish some of his criticism but averred that, "A television critic would have to know everything, and who knows everything?" James had been lost for an answer at the time but in the preface replies, "It isn't necessary to know everything – just to remember that nobody else does either."
