= May Week was in June =

1990 memoir by Australian writer Clive James

May Week was in June is a memoir by Australian writer Clive James published by Jonathan Cape in 1990. The book recounts his time at Pembroke College, Cambridge as an undergraduate, joining the Cambridge Footlights, and starting a PhD thesis (but never completed) on the works of Shelley.
