= Fame in the 20th Century =

1993 British TV series

- Genre: Documentary
- Created by: Clive James
- Written by: Clive James
- Country of origin: United Kingdom
- Original language: English
- No. of series: 1
- No. of episodes: 8

Production
- Producer: BBC

Original release
- Network: BBC
- Release: 6 January – 24 February 1993

Fame in the 20th Century is a 1993 BBC documentary television series and book by Clive James. The book and series examined the phenomenon of fame and how it expanded to international mass media proportions throughout the 20th century. The series first aired starting in January 1993, with 8 episodes divided in roughly 8 decades, from the 1900s to the 1980s. Each episode highlighted world-famous people during that part of the century. James delivered interesting and amusing comments about the portrayed celebrities and the various ways they became famous.

In the United States, the series were broadcast on PBS and in Australia on ABC, though some footage was occasionally cut if the rights to it were too expensive. The series has never been repeated on television since, which James attributes to the fact that "every inch of footage in the gigantic compilation belonged to some agency legally equipped to charge the Earth." He further points out that the book contains "the text almost exactly as I read it out on screen... but I took care even at the time to write it as if it might have to survive on its own."

== Concept ==
James and his team developed the series as a study on the concept fame, and more specifically "world fame". They focused on over 250 people who are "undeniably world famous". Certain artists, musicians or sports figures became well known even for people who don't know much about their field. Louis Armstrong is for instance world-famous, even for non-jazz fans or experts. Pelé became the most famous association football player, even in the US: one of the few countries in the world where the sport isn't popular. People who know nothing about art have heard of the name Pablo Picasso and know his style. People who are not interested in tennis have heard of John McEnroe, due to his bad behavior on the tennis court. More people know Luciano Pavarotti than Plácido Domingo.

Clive James focused on fame in the 20th century, because the arrival of mass media, film and television changed forever the ways people became famous. In previous centuries people could only become famous by doing something that was remembered ages later. Julius Caesar and Napoleon Bonaparte conquered countries, Jesus Christ developed a religion, ... In the 20th century people could become world-famous in less than no time and without doing anything, thanks to the arrival of mass media. Movie stars like Charlie Chaplin, for instance, became global stars due to the nearly universal reach of film. James cites Chaplin as the first truly world-famous 20th century celebrity. The invention of the film close-up made people on film screens appear larger than life and thus increased the emotional involvement of the audience. This often led to mass hysteria and confusion between an actor's stage persona and the roles he played on the screen (as in the case of Rudolph Valentino). Certain politicians in the century have used the media to promote their own image to the public, for instance John F. Kennedy, who looked like a movie star, and Ronald Reagan who was a former movie star.

People could become world-famous in a matter of a few days. Orson Welles became notorious after his radio play The War of the Worlds caused mass hysteria in the United States. Salman Rushdie, who was already known in literary circles, became a household name to the broader public due to the fatwa spoken out against him in 1989. Clive James sees the US as the place where this new type of mass media fame was born. According to him international fame is only possible if the celebrity becomes famous in the USA. Cricketer Jack Hobbs was world-famous throughout the British Empire in the interbellum, but unknown in countries where cricket was not popular, like the USA. Babe Ruth however became internationally famous even though baseball was played hardly anywhere else outside the US.

Other celebrities have been around for so long that the reason they originally became famous has been almost forgotten. Elizabeth Taylor has been cited by James as an example of someone who originally achieved fame as an actress, but later became more famous for her weddings and lifestyle. As James observed, the fame of some celebrities fades away after a few years. Silent movie stars like Florence Lawrence and William S. Hart, for instance, have nowadays sunk into obscurity. Other celebrities have become more famous over time. James cites T. E. Lawrence as an example. The British military officer became famous during World War I, but only became truly world-famous with the general public thanks to the 1962 movie Lawrence of Arabia. Celebrities like Charlie Chaplin, Frank Sinatra, Elvis Presley, Marilyn Monroe, Madonna, Michael Jackson, The Beatles on the other hand, have never remained out of publicity and are nowadays famous for simply being who they are. Some people became famous due to their association with other celebrities. Examples are Yoko Ono (the wife of Beatle John Lennon), Lady Diana (who married Prince Charles in 1981) and Wallis Simpson (whose affair with King Edward VIII of the United Kingdom caused his abdication). Another phenomenon examined in the series is the change of someone's fame during time and thanks to mass media coverage. Charles Lindbergh, first famous as an aviation pioneer, became, to his horror, even more famous when his son was kidnapped and murdered. Dwight Eisenhower's fame as a general in World War II helped him win the presidential election a decade later. Joseph McCarthy used the media in his hunt against communism, but in the end the media worked against him. Elvis Presley's fame grew to legendary proportions after his death, when he sold more albums than during his lifetime.

When Clive James was asked by Charlie Rose in 1993 to name the three most famous people of the century, he cited Elvis Presley, Muhammad Ali, and Bruce Lee. He also mentioned Adolf Hitler, saying, "but the fact is the young Neo-Nazis in Germany now don't really know much about Hitler. So that kind of fame not necessarily lasts."

== Famous moments ==
The television series made use of seldom seen archive material and world-famous photographs, film and audio material where celebrities did or said famous things. Sometimes the footage was not famous, but was used as a typical example of what the public associates with the celebrity or to show them during a more casual moment, instead of as an icon. Examples are:

1900–1929

- A recording of Enrico Caruso's famous performance of "Vesti La Giubba" (1903), the first bestselling record.
- The Wright Brothers filmed during their second flight with their airplane, because when they made their historic first flight there were no motion picture cameras around to record it.
- Louis Blériot, after his famous flight over the English Channel in 1909.
- Marie Curie accepting one of her two Nobel Prizes, becoming the first woman to win this prestigious award (twice).
- Harry Houdini escaping while being tied to a chair in the presence of a sleeping guard and being pulled up in the air upside down, while he tries to get out of a straitjacket.
- Isadora Duncan dancing in a forest.
- The famous poster Lord Kitchener Wants You showing Herbert Kitchener, 1st Earl Kitchener demanding "the British Army wants you".
- The funeral of legendary pilot Manfred von Richthofen, aka The Red Baron.
- Vladimir Lenin giving a speech.
- Charlie Chaplin crossing a road in The Tramp (1915), the movie which first established his character The Tramp.
- Rudolph Valentino in The Sheik (1921).
- Douglas Fairbanks in various swashbuckler roles in Robin Hood (1922), The Thief of Bagdad (1924) and The Black Pirate (1926).
- Buster Keaton in the rock boulder scene in Seven Chances (1925) and in Steamboat Bill, Jr. (1928), where a building facade collapses all around him, though he survives by standing in the path of an open attic window.
- Greta Garbo and John Gilbert sharing the first horizontal kiss in Flesh and the Devil (1925).
- Japanese emperor Hirohito during his visit to London in 1921, when he was still crown prince.
- Benito Mussolini giving one of his bombastic speeches.
- Al Jolson speaking in the first movie with sound The Jazz Singer (1927).
- Josephine Baker performing her famous banana skirt dance.
- The Long Count Fight between Jack Dempsey and Gene Tunney (1927).
- Charles Lindbergh landing in Paris and being greeted by a massive crowd after flying non-stop over the Atlantic Ocean (1927).
- Alfred Hitchcock in one of his earliest film cameos, in the film Blackmail.
- Louis Armstrong performing "Dinah" during a 1933 performance in Copenhagen, where he clowns it up while singing.
- Duke Ellington performing "Mood Indigo".
- Johnny Weissmuller swinging from a vine, shouting his Tarzan yell and delivering his famous speech as Tarzan to Jane.
- A recording of Igor Stravinsky's The Rite of Spring, the musical piece which inspired a riot during its 1913 premier.
- A recording of George Gershwin's "Rhapsody in Blue".

1930–1949

- Marlene Dietrich singing while sitting on a crate in Der Blaue Engel (1930) and performing in a male tuxedo in Morocco (1930).
- Maurice Chevalier singing and dancing in The Love Parade (1929).
- An audio recording of Noël Coward and Gertrude Lawrence performing the "How was the Taj Mahal?" scene from Coward's play Private Lives (1930).
- James Cagney pushing a grapefruit in the face of his lover in The Public Enemy (1931).
- Greta Garbo asking to be "left alone" in Grand Hotel (1932).
- Mae West asking Cary Grant "to come up and see me some time" in She Done Him Wrong (1933).
- Mahatma Gandhi during his visit to London in 1931.
- George Bernard Shaw describing Benito Mussolini, Adolf Hitler and Joseph Stalin rather jokingly and amiably in various film reels.
- Adolf Hitler' s final speech in Leni Riefenstahl's Triumph des Willens (1934), where he is announced by Rudolf Hess. Private colour film footage of Hitler and Eva Braun in their holiday location in Berchtesgaden was also shown.
- Fred Astaire and Ginger Rogers dancing together in Top Hat (1935) to the song "Cheek to Cheek".
- Clark Gable removing his shirt and revealing himself to be bare chested in It Happened One Night (1934).
- Laurel and Hardy using a box of snuff on side of a bridge in Bonnie Scotland (1935).
- The Marx Brothers' parody on the MGM lion logo at the beginning of their film A Night at the Opera (1935) and a scene where Groucho Marx insults Margaret Dumont at the table, from the same movie.
- Arturo Toscanini conducting a performance of the American national anthem, while making his famous wild movements.
- Bing Crosby performing "Pennies from Heaven".
- Shirley Temple singing Animal Crackers in My Soup in Curly Top (1935).
- Amy Johnson, interviewed after her famous flight over the Pacific Ocean from Great Britain to Australia in 1930.
- Gary Cooper during one of his heroic roles in Mr. Deeds Goes to Town (1936).
- Henry Fonda giving his "I'll be there..." speech in The Grapes of Wrath (1940).
- John Wayne in his breakthrough role as a cowboy in Stagecoach (1939).
- Errol Flynn in The Adventures of Robin Hood (1938).
- Jean Harlow during her famous "I was reading a book the other day" scene in Dinner at Eight (1933).
- Jesse Owens winning four gold medals at the 1936 Summer Olympics in Berlin.
- Joe Louis defeating Max Schmeling in 1936 and becoming world champion heavyweight boxing as a result.
- Edward VIII announcing his abdication, because he wasn't allowed to marry "the woman I love": Wallis Simpson.
- Orson Welles' notorious radio play The War of the Worlds (1938) and him starring in Citizen Kane (1941).
- Neville Chamberlain declaring "peace in our time" and waving a peace agreement he signed with Adolf Hitler at Munich (1938)
- James Stewart's final speech in Mr. Smith Goes to Washington (1939) and a typical scene where he acts clumsy in You Can't Take It with You (1938).
- Judy Garland singing "You Made Me Love You (I Didn't Want to Do It)" in Broadway Melody of 1938 (1938) and "Over The Rainbow" in The Wizard of Oz (1939).
- Joan Crawford giving a feisty speech at the phone in The Women (1939).
- Greta Garbo in her final famous film Ninotchka (1939).
- Cary Grant and Katharine Hepburn in their famous screwball comedy Bringing Up Baby (1938).
- Clark Gable and Vivien Leigh's final scene in Gone with the Wind where Gable says, "Frankly, my dear, I don't give a damn" (1939).
- One of Franklin D. Roosevelt' s fireside chats.
- Glenn Miller performing In the Mood.
- Charlie Chaplin imitating Adolf Hitler in The Great Dictator (1940).
- Bette Davis shooting her partner while descending some stairs in The Letter (1940)
- Winston Churchill declaring his "I have nothing to offer but blood, toil, tears and sweat", "Never was so much owed by so many to so few" and "we will fight them on the beaches" (1940) speeches.
- Charles de Gaulle delivering his radio speech about the liberation of France on Radio London on 18 June 1940, which gave him the nickname "the man of 18 June". And in 1944 when he marches through the Champs Elysées, after Paris has been liberated from the Nazis.
- Betty Grable as the Pin-Up Girl.
- Humphrey Bogart and Ingrid Bergman in the "We'll always have Paris" scene in Casablanca (1942).
- Ronald Reagan in his famous "Where's the rest of me?" scene in Kings Row (1942).
- Noël Coward as Lord Louis Mountbatten in the British war propaganda movie In Which We Serve (1942).
- Vera Lynn singing "We'll Meet Again".
- Rita Hayworth singing "Put the Blame on Mame" in Gilda.
- Frank Sinatra singing "As Long There's Music" in the film Step Lively (1944).
- Spencer Tracy and Katharine Hepburn talking about drinking in Woman of the Year (1942).
- General Douglas MacArthur announcing "I shall return!" after he and his troops were forced to retreat from the Philippines in 1942 by a Japanese invasion, a promise he fulfilled in 1945, when he let cameras record him and his troops walking ashore again, after reconquering Bataan.
- Benito Mussolini hung upside down in public after being murdered by partisans (1945).
- Paul Robeson singing "Deep River" in The Proud Valley (1940).

1950–1969

- Elizabeth Taylor getting married in Father of the Bride (1950).
- The I Love Lucy episode "Lucy Does a TV Commercial" (1952), where Lucille Ball tries to sell Vitameatavegamin, and "Lucy Goes to the Hospital" (1953) in which her character has to give birth and is brought to the hospital. The latter episode was the most watched television broadcast in the United States at that time.
- The famous 1951 photograph by Arthur Sasse of Albert Einstein sticking out his tongue.
- Liberace performing with his famous chandelier standing on top of his piano.
- The coronation of Elizabeth II (1953).
- Edmund Hillary and Tenzing Norgay photographed on top of Mount Everest.
- Roger Bannister running under the four-minute mile in 1954.
- Joseph McCarthy interrogating people whether they have ever been a member of Communist parties and the famous See It Now TV report with journalist Edward R. Murrow which exposed the unconstitutional tactics of McCarthyism.
- Richard Nixon giving his 1952 Checkers speech.
- Gene Kelly singing "Singin' in the Rain" in the movie of the same name (1952).
- Richard Burton in The Robe (1953), the first film in Cinemascope.
- Frank Sinatra in his Oscar-winning role in From Here to Eternity (1953) and singing "The Lady Is a Tramp" in Pal Joey (1957).
- Sophia Loren dancing in The Pride and the Passion (1957).
- Marilyn Monroe standing on a subway grate which makes her dress blown above her knees in The Seven Year Itch (1955) and walking with a suitcase near the station in Some Like It Hot (1959).
- Doris Day singing "Secret Love" in Calamity Jane (1953).
- Marlon Brando "cleaning the table" and yelling for Stella in A Streetcar Named Desire (1951).
- James Dean in a television commercial for road safety and driving a fast car in Rebel Without A Cause (1955).
- Bill Haley performing "Rock Around the Clock".
- Elvis Presley singing and swinging his hips during his highly watched and controversial first appearance in The Ed Sullivan Show (1956).
- Elvis Presley dancing with prisoners in Jailhouse Rock (1957).
- Brigitte Bardot dancing in And God Created Woman (1956), the film which made her a star.
- Grace Kelly talking about diamonds in To Catch A Thief (1955).
- Grace Kelly's marriage with Rainier III of Monaco in 1956.
- Alec Guinness in The Bridge Over The River Kwai (1957).
- Hugh Hefner during one of his Playboy parties at his Playboy Mansion.
- Pablo Picasso painting on the camera in Henri-Georges Clouzot's documentary The Mystery of Picasso (1956).
- Nikita Khrushchev debating with Richard Nixon during the Kitchen Debate (1959).
- Nikita Khrushchev during his shoe-banging incident at the United Nations convention (1960).
- The famous television debate between John F. Kennedy and Richard Nixon during the 1960 United States presidential election, which was the first presidential debate to be broadcast on U.S. television.
- The famous photograph Guerrillero Heroico (1960) by Alberto Korda of Che Guevara.
- Yuri Gagarin during his space flight which made him the first human in outer space.
- Marilyn Monroe singing "Happy Birthday, Mr. President" to John F. Kennedy in 1962.
- The famous photograph by Lewis Morley of call girl Christine Keeler seated in the nude on a chair.
- Martin Luther King Jr. delivering his "I Have a Dream" speech at the March on Washington for Jobs and Freedom (1963).
- The assassination of John F. Kennedy in the famous Zapruder film (1963).
- Jack Ruby assassinating Lee Harvey Oswald (1963).
- The Beatles performing "She Loves You" and arriving in the United States at the airport in 1964.
- Bob Dylan performing "The Times They Are a-Changin'".
- Peter Sellers as Inspector Clouseau, asking for a room in The Pink Panther Strikes Again (1976).
- Elizabeth Taylor and Richard Burton in Cleopatra (1963).
- Sean Connery during the Gun barrel sequence which starts every James Bond movie and seducing a Bond Girl in Goldfinger (1964).
- Rudolf Nureyev giving one of his ballet performances.
- Clint Eastwood as The Man With No Name in Sergio Leone's For a Few Dollars More (1965).
- Muhammad Ali, declaring himself "the greatest" after winning the 1964 world championship boxing.
- The Rolling Stones performing "Get Off of My Cloud".
- The Beatles giving the first arena rock concert in Shea Stadium in 1965.
- Billy Graham during one of his sermons held in stadiums.
- William Shatner as Captain Kirk in Star Trek.
- Andy Warhol's paintings of Campbell's Soup Cans and the Marilyn Diptych.
- The Beatles performing "All You Need Is Love" in an international live television broadcast (1967).
- The Beatles visiting the Maharishi Mahesh Yogi (1967–1968).
- The footage of Ché Guevara's corpse after he had been assassinated in 1967 by the Bolivian army.
- Aristotle Onassis remarrying with Jacqueline Kennedy Onassis in 1967.
- Dustin Hoffman in The Graduate (1968).
- Elvis Presley performing during his Elvis Presley's '68 Comeback Special.
- The assassination of Robert F. Kennedy in 1968.
- Jane Fonda in Barbarella (1968).
- Barbra Streisand in Funny Girl (1968).
- Neil Armstrong setting foot on the Moon and saying: "It's one small step for men, one giant leap for mankind." (1969).
- Paul Newman and Robert Redford jumping off a cliff in Butch Cassidy and the Sundance Kid (1969).
- John Lennon and Yoko Ono during their 1969 Bed-In.
- Charles Manson being interviewed during the Tate murders trial.

1970–1990

- A 1970 commercial for Lanvin chocolate starring Salvador Dalí.
- A late 1970s commercial for Paul Masson champagne with Orson Welles.
- Jane Fonda during her controversial 1972 trip to Hanoi, Vietnam, where she met Vietnamese soldiers and spoke out against the United States' involvement in the Vietnam War.
- Frank Sinatra performing "My Way".
- Clint Eastwood delivering his Magnum-speech in Dirty Harry (1971).
- Marlon Brando saying "I'm gonna make him an offer he can't refuse" in The Godfather (1972).
- Olga Korbut, Mark Spitz and Bobby Fischer at the 1972 Olympic Games.
- The Osmonds performing during one of their TV specials.
- William Conrad playing Cannon in the TV series Cannon.
- Raymond Burr playing Ironside in the TV series Ironside.
- Peter Falk playing Columbo in the TV series Columbo.
- Telly Savalas playing Kojak in the TV series Kojak.
- David Bowie performing as Ziggy Stardust.
- Bruce Lee in Enter the Dragon (1973).
- The arrest of the Baader-Meinhof gang.
- Richard Nixon's declaring "I'm not a crook" in 1973 during the Watergate scandal and his eventual resignation speech in 1974.
- Alexander Solzhenitsyn arriving in the United States after being expelled from the Soviet Union in 1974.
- Patty Hearst caught on security camera robbing a bank in the presence of the people who kidnapped her.
- Jack Nicholson in One Flew Over the Cuckoo's Nest (1975)
- Robert De Niro during his famous "You talkin' to me?" speech in Taxi Driver (1976).
- ABBA in their music video for "Money, Money, Money".
- Sylvester Stallone jogging to the melody of "Gonna Fly Now" in Rocky (1976).
- Idi Amin joking around on camera to distract attention away from his actual dictatorship.
- Gerald Ford caught on camera during several of his famous falls and other accidents.
- Woody Allen in Annie Hall (1977).
- The Sex Pistols performing "God Save the Queen".
- Ayatollah Khomeini returning to Iran in 1979, after the regime of the Shah had been toppled.
- John McEnroe shouting and protesting against the referee during his tennis match against Björn Borg (1980).
- Dustin Hoffman and Meryl Streep in Kramer vs. Kramer (1979).
- Pope John Paul II habitually kissing the tarmac after his arrival by plane.
- Larry Hagman being shot in his role as J. R. Ewing in Dallas in 1980.
- Lech Wałęsa leading the Solidarity movement.
- The wedding of Prince Charles and Diana in 1981.
- Ronald Reagan being shot by John Hinckley Jr. (1981).
- Margaret Thatcher telling people to "rejoice" after a victorious battle during the Falklands War.
- Michael Jackson in his famous music video Thriller and singing "Billie Jean" at the Motown 25: Yesterday, Today, Forever special in 1983, where he performed his first moonwalk dance.
- Madonna dressed in wedding whites in the legend-making appearance at the MTV awards in 1984, where her performance sent spinning all previous standards of acceptable raunchiness in pop music.
- Arnold Schwarzenegger saying "I'll be back" in The Terminator (1984).
- The infamous cliffhanger ending of the Dynasty episode Moldavian Massacre (1985) in which a wedding of the main characters is interrupted by terrorists in a military coup, seemingly killing many cast members, including Joan Collins as Alexis.
- Sylvester Stallone shooting around as John Rambo in Rambo: First Blood Part II (1985).
- Jane Fonda in one of her 1982 aerobics videos.
- Bob Geldof at the Live Aid concert (1985).
- Oliver North trying to defend himself in front of the United States Congress at the height of the Iran-Contra affair (1987).
- Ronald Reagan during his State of the Union address in 1987 after his administration got entangled in the Iran-Contra affair.
- Ronald Reagan and Mikhail Gorbachev during the 1986 Reykjavík Summit.
- Saddam Hussein and Norman Schwarzkopf during the Gulf War.
- Luciano Pavarotti singing "Nessun Dorma" at the first Three Tenors concert in 1990.

== Celebrities portrayed in the series ==
=== Carried over from the 19th century ===
Clive James included these nine celebrities, who were internationally famous from the late 19th century into the 20th century:

- William Randolph Hearst
- Thomas Alva Edison
- Queen Victoria of the United Kingdom
- Leo Tolstoy
- Arthur Conan Doyle
- Rudyard Kipling
- Sarah Bernhardt
- Isadora Duncan
- Buffalo Bill

=== 1900–1918 ===
For the period from the start of the 1900s to the 1918 end of World War I, Clive James puts forth these 36 celebrities:

- Enrico Caruso
- Wilbur Wright and Orville Wright
- Louis Blériot
- Marie Curie
- Theodore Roosevelt
- Florence Lawrence
- Francis X. Bushman
- William S. Hart
- Theda Bara
- Harry Houdini
- Robert Falcon Scott
- Roald Amundsen
- Henry James
- Jack Johnson
- Wilhelm II
- Paul von Hindenburg
- Ferdinand Foch
- George V of the United Kingdom
- Lloyd George
- Lord Kitchener
- The Red Baron
- T. E. Lawrence (Lawrence of Arabia)
- Mata Hari
- Lenin
- Henry Ford
- Douglas Fairbanks
- Mary Pickford
- Charlie Chaplin
- Greta Garbo
- John Gilbert
- Sigmund Freud
- Pablo Picasso
- Igor Stravinsky
- Albert Einstein
- Albert Schweitzer

=== 1918–1932 ===
For the period from the 1918 end of World War I to 1932, just prior to the January 1933 appointment of Adolf Hitler as Chancellor of Germany, Clive James lists these 36 celebrities:

- Suzanne Lenglen
- Anna Pavlova
- Nellie Melba
- Amy Johnson
- Malcolm Campbell
- Henry Segrave
- Jack Hobbs
- Donald Bradman
- Babe Ruth
- Jack Dempsey
- Charles Lindbergh
- Al Capone
- Louis Armstrong
- Duke Ellington
- Josephine Baker
- F. Scott Fitzgerald
- Rudolph Valentino
- D. H. Lawrence
- James Joyce
- Coco Chanel
- Noël Coward
- Gertrude Lawrence
- Al Jolson
- Buster Keaton
- Laurel and Hardy
- T. S. Eliot
- Marlene Dietrich
- Maurice Chevalier
- Jeanette MacDonald
- Nelson Eddy
- Mae West
- George Gershwin
- Fred Astaire
- Ginger Rogers
- Bruno Hauptmann

=== 1932–1939 ===
For the period from Adolf Hitler's rise to power in Germany, to the final days before he starts World War II in September 1939, James lists these 48 famous people:

- Benito Mussolini
- George Bernard Shaw
- Adolf Hitler
- Rudolf Hess
- Joseph Goebbels
- Hermann Göring
- Heinrich Himmler
- Eva Braun
- Johnny Weissmuller
- Franklin D. Roosevelt
- Eleanor Roosevelt
- Mahatma Gandhi
- The Marx Brothers
- Bing Crosby
- Shirley Temple
- Arturo Toscanini
- Walt Disney
- Gary Cooper
- Howard Hughes
- Amy Johnson
- James Stewart
- Henry Fonda
- James Cagney
- John Wayne
- Errol Flynn
- Clark Gable
- Vivien Leigh
- Jean Harlow
- Edward G. Robinson
- Joan Crawford
- Bette Davis
- Katharine Hepburn
- Spencer Tracy
- Ernest Hemingway
- Francisco Franco
- Orson Welles
- Edward VIII of the United Kingdom
- Wallis Simpson
- George VI of the United Kingdom
- Salvador Dalí
- Jesse Owens
- Joe Louis
- Max Schmeling
- Neville Chamberlain
- Joseph Stalin
- Judy Garland
- J. Edgar Hoover
- Billie Holiday

=== 1939–1945 ===
For the period covering World War II, James puts forth these 44 famous people:

- Winston Churchill
- Charles de Gaulle
- Philippe Pétain
- Bob Hope
- Humphrey Bogart
- Ingrid Bergman
- Hirohito
- Hideki Tōjō
- Isoroku Yamamoto
- Erwin Rommel
- Bernard Law Montgomery
- Lord Louis Mountbatten
- George Formby Jr.
- Gracie Fields
- Vera Lynn
- Laurence Olivier
- Douglas MacArthur
- David Niven
- Ronald Reagan
- Frank Sinatra
- Benny Goodman
- Cary Grant
- Tommy Dorsey
- Artie Shaw
- Harry James
- Gene Krupa
- Glenn Miller
- Betty Grable
- Rita Hayworth
- Dwight Eisenhower
- George Patton
- Jean-Paul Sartre
- Simone de Beauvoir
- Jean Cocteau
- Chester W. Nimitz
- Harry S. Truman
- Ava Gardner
- Audie Murphy
- Guy Gibson
- Douglas Bader
- Mao Zedong
- Alfred Hitchcock
- Charlie Parker
- Margot Fonteyn

=== 1945–1960 ===
For the period from the end of World War II, to the dawn of the 1960s, James lists these 50 people:

- Liberace
- Lucille Ball
- Edmund Hillary
- Tenzing Norgay
- Roger Bannister
- Elizabeth II
- Richard Nixon
- Joseph McCarthy
- Edward Murrow
- Paul Robeson
- Richard Burton
- Gene Kelly
- Sophia Loren
- Dean Martin and Jerry Lewis
- Marilyn Monroe
- Joe DiMaggio
- Arthur Miller
- Jack Lemmon
- Tony Curtis
- Brigitte Bardot
- Billy Graham
- Diana Dors
- Guy Gibson
- Richard Todd
- Kenneth More
- Alec Guinness
- Grace Kelly
- Rainier III
- Hugh Hefner
- Doris Day
- Rock Hudson
- Miles Davis
- Farouk I
- Aga Khan III
- Prince Aly Khan
- Juan Manuel Fangio
- Stirling Moss
- Charlton Heston
- Aristotle Onassis
- Maria Callas
- Evita Peron
- Marlon Brando
- James Dean
- Bill Haley
- Elvis Presley
- Colonel Tom Parker
- Pelé
- Nikita Khrushchev
- Fidel Castro

=== 1960–1969 ===
For the Sixties, a period of complex inter-related cultural and political trends around the globe, Clive James lists 31 individuals and the collective members in each of two musical groups:

- John F. Kennedy
- Jacqueline Kennedy
- Elizabeth Taylor
- Sean Connery
- Christine Keeler
- John Profumo
- Sammy Davis Jr.
- Peter Sellers
- Steve McQueen
- Rudolph Nureyev
- Yuri Gagarin
- Lee Harvey Oswald
- Jack Ruby
- Lyndon B. Johnson
- The Beatles
- The Rolling Stones
- Brian Epstein
- Maharishi Mahesh Yogi
- Yoko Ono
- Bob Dylan
- Che Guevara
- William Calley
- Muhammad Ali
- Martin Luther King Jr.
- Robert F. Kennedy
- Jane Fonda
- Leonid Brezhnev
- William Shatner
- Clint Eastwood
- Neil Armstrong
- Charles Manson
- Andy Warhol
- Prince Charles

=== 1969–1981 ===
For the period from the end of the Sixties, to the 1981 end of the Iran hostage crisis, James' list includes 34 individuals, the collective members in each of three musical groups and six fictional television characters (with the names of the actors performing them):

- Henry Kissinger
- Mother Teresa
- Al Pacino
- Cher
- Elton John
- Jack Nicholson
- Warren Beatty
- Robert Redford
- Robert De Niro
- Paul Newman
- Raymond Burr
  - as Ironside
- William Conrad
  - as Cannon
- Peter Falk
  - as Columbo
- James Garner
  - as Jim Rockford
- Telly Savalas
  - as Kojak
- The Osmonds
- Gerald Ford
- Mark Spitz
- Bobby Fischer
- Olga Korbut
- Alexander Solzhenitsyn
- Jodie Foster
- Björn Borg
- Billie Jean King
- Chris Evert
- John McEnroe
- ABBA
- Bruce Lee
- David Bowie
- Patty Hearst
- Idi Amin
- Woody Allen
- Dustin Hoffman
- Steven Spielberg
- Barbra Streisand
- John Travolta
- George Lucas
- Andreas Baader and Ulrike Meinhof
- The Sex Pistols
- Jimmy Carter
- Pope John Paul II
- Meryl Streep
- Larry Hagman
  - as J. R. Ewing
- Ruhollah Khomeini

=== 1981–1992 ===
For the period covering the myriad interlocking events that saw the end of the Cold War, replaced by a rising Islamic militancy, through to the 1992 cut off for the 1993 publication of his book, Clive James lists:

- Lech Wałęsa
- Margaret Thatcher
- Mark David Chapman
- John Hinckley Jr.
- Sylvester Stallone
- Lady Diana
- Michael Jackson
- Joan Collins
- Arnold Schwarzenegger
- Madonna
- Oprah Winfrey
- Eddie Murphy
- Bill Cosby
- Bob Geldof
- Oliver North
- Nelson Mandela
- Mikhail Gorbachev
- Donald Trump
- Martina Navratilova
- Muammar al-Gaddafi
- George H. W. Bush
- Tom Cruise
- Julia Roberts
- Mel Gibson
- Harrison Ford
- Salman Rushdie
- Václav Havel
- Bruce Willis
- Mike Tyson
- Saddam Hussein
- Norman Schwarzkopf
- Luciano Pavarotti
