= Julie Covington (album) =

- Cover art for the 2000 reissue

Studio album by Julie Covington
- Released: 1978
- Recorded: Britannia Row Studios, Islington
- Genre: Pop rock
- Length: 41:21
- Label: Virgin
- Producer: Joe Boyd, John Wood

Julie Covington chronology
The Beautiful Changes (1971)	Julie Covington (1978)

Professional ratings
Review scores
Source	Rating
AllMusic	4/5 stars

Julie Covington is a 1978 album by English singer Julie Covington. It was produced by Joe Boyd and the sound engineer was John Wood. Most of the album was recorded at Britannia Row Studios in Islington. It was her second album released on Virgin Records. In 2000, it was reissued as Julie Covington Plus and features two bonus tracks.

== Track listing ==
1. "(I Want to See the) Bright Lights" (Richard Thompson)
2. "By the Time It Gets Dark" (Sandy Denny)
3. "Sip the Wine" (Tim Drummond)
4. "How" (John Lennon)
5. "Barbara's Song" (Bertolt Brecht, Kurt Weill)
6. "A Little Bit More" (Karen Alexander)
7. "Let Me Make Something in Your Life" (Jim Capaldi, Steve Winwood)
8. "I Can't Dance" (Tom T. Hall)
9. "The Kick Inside" (Kate Bush)
10. "Dead Weight" (Anna McGarrigle)
11. "Dancing in the Dark" (Andy Fairweather Low)
- Bonus tracks on CD reissue:
12. "Only Women Bleed" (Alice Cooper, Dick Wagner)
13. "Easy to Slip" (Lowell George, Fred Martin)

== Charts ==
Chart (1979)	Peak position
Australia (Kent Music Report)	95

== Personnel ==
- Julie Covington – vocals
- Richard Thompson – guitar, mandola, backing vocals
- Willie Weeks - bass
- Neil Larsen - keyboards
- Andy Newmark - drums

with:

- Simon Nicol – rhythm guitar
- Trevor Lucas – 12-string acoustic guitar on "By the Time It Gets Dark", "A Little Bit More" and "Dead Weight", backing vocals
- Ray Russell – guitar on "Only Women Bleed"
- Russ Titelman – acoustic guitar on "How"
- Chris Spedding – Roland guitar synthesizer on "The Kick Inside"
- John Kirkpatrick – accordion on "Barbara's Song" and "I Can't Dance"
- John Cale – piano, clavinet on "(I Want to See the) Bright Lights", "By the Time It Gets Dark", "How" and "The Kick Inside"; arrangements on "Only Women Bleed" and "Easy to Slip"
- Steve Winwood – organ on "By the Time Gets Dark", "Sip the Wine" and "Let Me Make Something in Your Life"
- Plas Johnson – saxophone
- Dave Markee – bass on "Only Women Bleed"
- Mo Foster – fretless bass on "Only Women Bleed"
- Dave Pegg – bass on "Easy to Slip"
- Dave Mattacks – drums on "Only Women Bleed" and "Easy to Slip"
- Ray Cooper – percussion
- Greg Prestopino – backing vocals on "A Little Bit More"
- Andy Fairweather Low – backing vocals on "A Little Bit More"
- Gary Travers – backing vocals
- Iain Matthews – backing vocals
- Mandy More – backing vocals on "Only Women Bleed"
- Sue Jones-Davies – backing vocals on "Only Women Bleed"
