= Rock Follies of '77 (soundtrack) =

1977 UK television drama soundtrack album

Rock Follies

Soundtrack album by Julie Covington, Rula Lenska, Charlotte Cornwell and Sue Jones-Davies
- Released: June 1977
- Recorded: Roundhouse Studios 1977
- Genre: Pop rock
- Length: 43:07
- Label: Polydor Records
- Producer: Andy Mackay

Julie Covington, Rula Lenska, Charlotte Cornwell and Sue Jones-Davies chronology
| Rock Follies (1976) | Rock Follies (1977) |

Professional ratings
Review scores
| Source | Rating |
|---|---|
| Allmusic | 2.5/5 stars |

Rock Follies of '77 is a soundtrack album of the second series of the UK television drama Rock Follies. Released in 1977 on Polydor Records in both the UK and the US, the album contained 12 tracks from the series as performed by the stars Julie Covington, Charlotte Cornwell and Rula Lenska. In addition, cast member Sue Jones-Davies was a vocalist on many tracks, including the album's hit single "O.K.?" which reached #10 in June 1977.

== Overview ==
Rock Follies of '77 was released in early June 1977 as the soundtrack to the second series of the television drama Rock Follies, which itself was now under the title Rock Follies of '77. The series had begun transmission in May of that year, but by the time of the album's release was off the air due to a strike within the ITV network. The series finally resumed in November, with the final episode airing on 6 December 1977.

The series was a drama about a three-piece female rock band and their struggle to become famous. It featured a number of original compositions written by Andy Mackay of Roxy Music and the scriptwriter Howard Schuman. Twelve of these tracks made it to the album. As well as Mackay, who also produced, the album boasted a strong musical background with noted musicians playing on it, namely: Ray Russell, Tony Stevens and Peter Van Hooke.

The album's lead single "O.K.?" was released in May and became a UK chart hit by peaking at No. 10. This was credited to Julie Covington, Rula Lenska, Charlotte Cornwell and Sue Jones-Davies (the latter being an occasional addition to the line-up in the second series) rather than an overall group title (in the show itself, the group was called The Little Ladies). The album itself reached No.13 in the UK, proving less successful than the debut album which had peaked at No.1 a year earlier.

The album was originally issued in a gatefold sleeve on vinyl and was later issued on Compact disc in 2000. The CD version featured a bonus track "B-Side", which had been the B-side to the "O.K.?" single, and had been featured on the programme as a B-Side.

== Track listing ==
All titles composed by Andy Mackay and Howard Schuman

Side One

1. "Follies of '77" (4:02)
2. "Struttin' Ground" (4:05)
3. "Round 1" (3:55)
4. "The Hype" (3:35)
5. "Dee's Hype" (1:45)
6. "The Things You Have to Do" (4:03)

Side Two

1. "The Band Who Wouldn't Die" (2:37)
2. "Wolf at the Door" (2:35)
3. "Loose Change" (4:33)
4. "Jubilee" (3:02)
5. "OK?" (3:33)
6. "Real Life" (5:22)

CD Bonus track

1. "B-Side" (2:25)

== Personnel ==
- Julie Covington - Vocals
- Rula Lenska - Vocals
- Charlotte Cornwell - Vocals
- Sue Jones-Davies - Vocals
- Andy Mackay - Composer, Saxophone, Producer
- Chris Parren - Keyboards
- Ray Russell - Guitar, String Arrangements
- Tony Stevens - Bass
- Peter Van Hooke - Percussion
- Robin Williams - Violin
- Howard Schuman - Composer
- Denny Bridges - Rhythm Engineer
- Jon Wallis - Assistant Engineer
- Steve Prestage - Assistant Engineer
- Jon Wallis - Assistant Engineer
- John Punter - Mixing Supervision, Overdubs
