= Driving Through Mythical America =

Studio album by Pete Atkin
- Released: 1971
- Studio: Morgan Studios
- Labels: Philips Records, RCA Records
- Producer: Don Paul

Pete Atkin chronology
Beware of the Beautiful Stranger (1970)	Driving Through Mythical America (1971)	A King at Nightfall (1973)

Driving Through Mythical America is an album by British musician Pete Atkin, co-written by Atkin and songwriting partner Clive James. It was their second commercial release and features a more rock-oriented sound.

== Production ==
The album was recorded across four sessions in March 1971 at Morgan Studios in London, produced by Don Paul with engineering by Roger Quested. Most of the tracks were recorded live, or as live as possible, in order to keep the cost of the sessions low; Atkin used overdubs judiciously. Musicians included regular Morgan session players, as well as members of the band Blue Mink. The budget limitations of the previous album resulted in an acoustic folk sound. With an expanded production budget for their second effort, Atkin achieved a more rock-oriented sound.

According to Atkin and James, the album marked a turning point for the artists, away from writing songs for other performers to sing and toward more idiosyncratic style, structure and subject matter. "The Pearl Driller" was inspired by a BBC2 documentary on the pearl industry. "Prince of Aquitaine" departs from a line from T.S. Elliot's The Waste Land that may have been borrowed from poet Gerard de Nerval. "No Dice," inspired by a line from Louis MacNeice, portrays four different characters and their untimely deaths. Atkin considered it one of their best songs. "Practical Man" described a cynical viewpoint of the music industry, though both songwriters noted that they would have accepted such an offer at the time, if available.

The title track explored American themes, culture and iconography, though at the time of writing, James had not yet visited the country. Only Atkin had toured America, with the Oxford and Cambridge Shakespeare Company. James had nonetheless been inspired by recent events. "The Kent State disaster created, in my mind, a vortex of centripetal energy that pulled second-hand vignettes together with such force that they fused, as if a junk-pile had melted," he recalled in 2008.

== Critical reception and legacy ==
The album was critically acclaimed and remains one of the duo's most well regarded works. "From the first minute of the first track this album is clearly in another class altogether," said a favorable review by Dave Gelly in Creem. “Very interesting sounds against Pete Atkin’s soft vocalising” said NME, which singled out "The Faded Mansion on the Hill" for praise. Two years later, the 1973 re-issue was a "Near Miss" for critic Derek Jewell in his list of top albums of the year. Sounds likened the title track to a British version of "Desolation Row", and proclaimed the two as among the best songwriters in the country. Melody Maker also gave it a glowing review.

Though it sold the least well of the Atkin/James albums from that era, Shindig observed that it receives the most attention from contemporary listeners.

"The Flowers and the Wine" was covered by other artists. Doug Ashdown first recorded it in 1974, followed by John the Fish a year later. Val Doonican's version in 1980 provided royalties to Atkin and James that the songwriters jokingly claim surpassed their previous album sales. Liesbeth List recorded the song in 1982, with lyrics translated by Jan Simon Minkema. Sarah Moule recorded it in 2008.

Writer Tom Holt parodied "Practical Man" in the collection Bitter Lemmings in 1997.

== Track listing ==
1. "Sunlight Gate"
2. "The Pearl-Driller"
3. "No Dice"
4. "The Flowers and the Wine"
5. "Where Have They All Gone?"
6. "The Prince of Aquitaine"
7. "Thief in the Night"
8. "Driving Through Mythical America"
9. "The Faded Mansion on the Hill"
10. "Practical Man"
11. "Lady of a Day"

== Credits ==
=== Musicians ===
- Pete Atkin - lead vocals, guitar, piano
- Chris Spedding - electric guitar
- Barry Morgan - drums
- Alan Parker - electric guitar
- Herbie Flowers - bass
- Dave Bell - bass
- Kenny Clare - drums
- Russell Davies - trombone
- Dennis Clift - trumpet
- Leon Calvert – flugelhorn
- Jim Wortley – bass trombone
- Richard Ihnatowicz – clarinet
- Alan Wakeman – tenor sax
- Don Fay – tenor sax
- Clive Baker - trumpet, flugelhorn

=== Technical personnel ===
- Don Paul - producer
- Roger Quested - engineer
- Don Fraser - conductor
- Pat Doyle - cover design
