= A King at Nightfall =

Studio album by Pete Atkin
- Released: 1973
- Studio: Morgan Studios
- Label: RCA Records
- Producer: Don Paul

Pete Atkin chronology
Driving Through Mythical America (1971)	A King at Nightfall (1973)	The Road of Silk (1974)

A King at Nightfall is an album by British musician Pete Atkin, co-written by Atkin and songwriting partner Clive James. It featured a more cohesive and mature sound, along with some of the duo's most well regarded songs.

== Production ==
The album was recorded and mixed across twelve sessions in May, July and August 1972 at Morgan Studios in London. The producer was Don Paul and the engineer was Roger Quested. Funds from RCA records allowed Atkin enough resources to book the same musicians for all the rhythm elements, providing better cohesion. Each master track took about one hour to record.

“Between Us There is Nothing” was inspired by a Louis MacNeice poem “Meeting Point.” “Carnations on the Roof” featured a Motown-like groove. “All the Dead Were Strangers” began as a title, inspired by a line from a James Cagney movie and recent events such as the conviction of Captain William Calley for his role in the Mai Lai massacre. “The Wristwatch for a Drummer” departed from observing Buddy Rich wearing a watch during a BBC program. The title track borrowed its main phrase from T.S. Eliot’s “Four Quartets.” “The Last Hill That Shows You All the Valley” was written by James as a dirge, though Atkin set it instead to a rock tune. "Screen-Freak" exemplifies James' encyclopedic knowledge of cinema. On "Apparition in Las Vegas,” Atkin asked Chris Spedding to evoke the style of long time Elvis guitarist, Scotty Moore.

== Critical reception ==
The album was met with critical acclaim, for both its songwriting and its production. The single "Carnations on the Roof" was appreciated by Noel Edmunds and was a favorite of writer Nicholas Tomalin. Paired with a B-side of "Screen-Freak," it failed to chart but was recognized as a latter day classic among fans, including Stephen Morris.

"I look forward to their albums with impatience," wrote Dave Gelly in a favorable review for Creem magazine. Melody Maker also praised the album across feature articles and a shorter review, concluding that the album was their most accessible.

Sounds critic Paul Weir lauded the levels of complexity that rewarded repeated listening, while Jerry Gilbert, writing for the same publication described the songs as "precious stones in a beautiful setting." Dave Laing observed that the album marked a maturation of Atkin's arrangements and sound.

"Some time ago, I gave Pete Atkin's A King at Nightfall a half-hearted review," wrote Andrew Bailey of the London Evening Standard. "I was wrong."

== Track listing ==
1. "Between Us There is Nothing"
2. "Carnations on the Roof"
3. "All the Dead Were Strangers"
4. "The Wristwatch for a Drummer"
5. "A King at Nightfall"
6. "The Last Hill That Shows You All the Valley"
7. "The Double Agent"
8. "The Hypertension Kid"
9. "Screen-Freak"
10. "Apparition in Las Vegas"
11. "Thirty Year Man"

== Credits ==
=== Musicians ===
- Pete Atkin - vocals, acoustic guitar, piano
- Chris Spedding - electric guitar
- Mike Moran - keyboards
- Herbie Flowers bass guitar
- Barry Morgan
- Ray Cooper - percussion
- Clive Baker - trumpet, flugelhorn
- Ralph Izen - trumpet
- Nat Peck - trombone
- Bill Geldard - bass trombone
- Dick Hart - tuba
- Alan Wakeman - tenor saxophone, clarinet
- Bob Sydor - tenor saxophone, clarniet
- Mike Page - baritone saxophone, clarinet
- Howard Ball, John Trusler, David Woodcock, Rita Eddowes - violin
- Catherine Finnis, Leonard Stehn - cello

=== Technical personnel ===
- Don Paul - producer
- Roger Quested - engineer
- David Levin - photography

== See also ==
- A King at Nightfall at Discogs
