= The Road of Silk =

Studio album by Pete Atkin
- Released: 1974
- Studio: Morgan Studios
- Label: RCA Records
- Producer: Pete Atkin

Pete Atkin chronology
A King at Nightfall (1973)	The Road of Silk (1974)	Secret Drinker (1975)

The Road of Silk is an album by British musician Pete Atkin, co-written by Atkin and songwriting partner Clive James. It was Atkin's first outing as a solo producer. The release coincided with his first national tour, accompanied by a backing band with the prog rock group Riff Raff as the opening act.

== Production ==
The album was recorded over 16 sessions in July, September and October 1973 at Morgan Studios in London. It was the first of the Atkin/James albums to be produced solo by Pete Atkin, under a new RCA contract. Roger Quested returned as engineer. The sessions also reunited Atkin with fellow Cambridge alum Daryl Runswick, who last played bass on 1967's privately-pressed LP While the Music Lasts.

By this point in their careers, the two songwriters were sharing a house in Islington. Though their division of labor ostensibly remained the same, with lyrics by James and music by Atkin, the close proximity of their lives mirrored the closer collaboration between words and melody than in their previous efforts.

“The Shadow and the Widower” echoed the internal duality explored previously in “The Hypertension Kid” and exemplified James’ use of elaborate language despite its seeming unsuitability for popular song. “The Wall of Death” referenced memories of James’ childhood in Australia. “Care-Charmer Sleep” is an example of what Atkin described as their “littles”--songs that were shorter than average, of which the two were fond. Its sparseness presages a later turn toward brevity, and the title is from a sonnet by Samuel Daniel. “An Array of Passionate Lovers” reflected an increasing disillusionment with the counterculture idealism of the 1960s. “Payday Evening” underwent numerous re-writes and adjustments; Atkin made a bridge section out of several stanzas intended as verses. The phrase “midnight voices” was later used for a fan mailing list and forum that was instrumental in the revival of the Atkin/James music.

== Critical reception ==
The single release for "The Man Who Walked Toward the Music" received significant attention and praise. Perennial fan John Peel lamented the lack of a hit single, but appreciated its dry wit and balanced sound. George Melly also reviewed it favorably.

The album was critically acclaimed. Fred Dellar described the album as a "musical tapestry" replete with subtle poetry as well as clever wordplay. He singled out Atkin's arrangements on the title track and "Array of Passionate Lovers" as exceptional. Derek Jewell thought it was the pair's best album to-date, and listed it among the top twenty albums of the year: "there can be no finer song-writing team anywhere today." Dave Laing singled out guitarist Paul Keogh for praise, and "Payday Evening" as a standout track. He noted that the album supported the concept, forwarded by critic Stephen Barnard, that the best contemporary songwriters were looking beyond traditional rock music to realize their work.

RCA records initially pressed 5,000 copies, which quickly sold out. Atkin toured to support the album with a backing band, Mamma Flyer, but additional pressings at the record plant were preempted by other, more popular artists, resulting in a loss of sales for the album. Frustration with the mishandling of distribution later led to Atkin concluding his contract with RCA after the release of Live Libel.

== Track listing ==
1. "Perfect Moments"
2. "Shadow and the Widower"
3. "The Hollow and the Fluted Night"
4. "The Wall of Death"
5. "Senior Citizens"
6. "The Man Who Walked Toward the Music"
7. "Care-Charmer Sleep"
8. "Our Lady Lowness"
9. "My Egoist"
10. "An Array of Passionate Lovers"
11. "The Road of Silk"
12. "Payday Evening"

== Credits ==
=== Musicians ===
- Pete Atkin – lead vocals, guitar, piano
- Tony Coe – tenor sax
- Paul Keogh – electric guitar
- Mike Moran – electric piano
- Daryl Runswick – bass guitar
- Terry Cox – drums
- Frank Ricotti – percussion
- Dave Wintour – bass guitar
- Barry De Souza – drums
- David Katz and the Pop Art Strings – strings
- Ronnie Hughes – trumpet
- John Donnelly – trumpet
- Dave Sharman – trombone
- Allen Beever – tenor sax
- Derek Grossmith – tenor sax
- Manny Winter – baritone sax

=== Technical personnel ===
- Pete Atkin – production, arrangements
- Roger Quested – engineering
- Pat Doyle – photography and art direction
