= Beware of the Beautiful Stranger =

Studio album by Pete Atkin
- Released: 1970
- Studio: Regent Sound
- Labels: Fontana Records, RCA Records
- Producer: Don Paul

Pete Atkin chronology
The Party's Moving On (1969)	Beware of the Beautiful Stranger (1970)	Driving Through Mythical America (1971)

Beware of the Beautiful Stranger is the first commercially released album by British musician Pete Atkin in collaboration with writer Clive James. Critically acclaimed despite yielding no hit songs, it paved the way for a record deal and a string of releases that shared the esteem of critics but the indifference of the commercial market, along with an enthusiastic cult following. The cover art features Atkin leaning against a tree, wearing a velvet suit, with an old gypsy caravan in the background and an out-of-focus woman leaning against it, alluding to the title track.

== Production ==
Atkin and James met while attending Cambridge University as members of the Footlights. They connected through a mutual love of a broad range of music, from Buddy Holly to Tin Pan Alley. Although Atkin also wrote songs on his own, the two quickly began to collaborate with James writing lyrics and Atkin composing the music. They intended to write songs for other vocalists, inspired by fellow Footlights performers such as Julie Covington and Maggie Henderson. After two privately pressed LPs and in the midst of a television series with a number of Footlights alumni, the songwriters came to the attention of David Platz, who signed them to a publishing deal at Essex Music. Platz introduced them to producer Don Paul, and recording commenced with the intention of demoing the songs to pitch to other performers. Paul gave several of the tracks to his friend, DJ Kenny Everett, who began playing them regularly. Everett was particularly enamored with "Master of the Revels" and "Girl on the Train".

The album was recorded across three sessions in March and April 1970 at Regent Sound Studio A in London. Former Viscounts member Don Paul served as producer, assisted by engineer Tom Allom. Russell Davies, a friend from Footlights, played tuba. Don Paul lent Atkin the velvet suit seen on the album cover, sourced from London fashion store Mr. Fish

Numerous songs previously appeared on the privately pressed The Party's Moving On album in 1969, sung by Julie Covington and Pete Atkin and corresponding to their television series of the same name: "Girl on the Train," "Sunrise," "Have You Got a Biro I Can Borrow?," "Luck of the Draw," "All I Ever Did," and "You Can't Expect to Be Remembered."

The production of Julie Covington's The Beautiful Changes album overlaps with Beware of the Beautiful Stranger; sessions at Abbey Road Studios with Covington took place over 1969-1971. Atkin joined Covington in the studio during many of those sessions, providing arrangements and playing piano and guitar on several tracks. Covington's album shared producer Don Paul, and featured songs such as Atkin's solo composition "The Original Original Honky Tonk Night Train Blues" and the Atkin/James "Tonight Your Love is Over" on a later reissue.

The songs cover a diverse array of subjects and inspirations. A line from John Keats provided the title of "Touch Has a Memory" (Atkin was dissatisfied with the track and it was replaced on the 1973 reissue). Lex Banning provided the title of "Rider to the World's End". On "Luck of the Draw", Atkin and James pay homage to the short, concise songs of Rodgers and Hart, a structure they would continue to value over the years. "The Original Original Honky Tonk Night Train Blues", a favorite from Footlights performances, was inspired by "Honky Tonk Train Blues" by Meade Lux Lewis. And "You Can't Expect to Be Remembered" echoes the conversational style of rarely-heard verses of American Songbook standards, those of which tended to transition to and from the scenic context of the musical theatre play, in which the songs were often embedded.

The album prompted other covers as well: "Girl on the Train" was recorded by Joe Stead in 1973, while "Master of the Revels" appeared on a Don Partridge album in 1974. Wizz Jones recorded "Touch Has a Memory" in 1987 and 2018. Atkin and Julie Covington performed "The Original Original Honky Tonk Night Train Blues" in the 1977 television film and corresponding album of The Mermaid Frolics. Writer Tom Holt parodied "Rider to the World's End" in the collection Bitter Lemmings in 1997.

The title track was one of the first songs the duo wrote together, and remains one of Atkin's most performed songs.

== Critical reception ==
The album was critically acclaimed. Sounds, which had just begun publishing a week before, noted that Atkin was likely classified as folk music, for lack of a better category and praised the quality of the music: "One of the most immediately impressive albums of the year". It was recommended by NME and favorably reviewed by Disc and the Belfast Telegraph. Comedian Stephen Fry cited it as one of his favorite records.

== Track listing ==
All songs written by Pete Atkin and Clive James, except "The Original Original Honky Tonk Night Train Blues" and "All I Ever Did" which were written by Pete Atkin.

1. "The Master of the Revels"
2. "Touch Has a Memory"
3. "Be Careful When They Offer You the Moon"
4. "Have You Got A Biro I Can Borrow?"
5. "Sunrise"
6. "Frangipanni Was Her Flower"
7. "The Rider to the World's End"
8. "The Luck of the Draw"
9. "The Original Original Honky Tonk Night Train Blues"
10. "Girl on the Train"
11. "Tonight Your Love is Over"
12. "You Can't Expect to be Remembered"
13. "Laughing Boy"
14. "Beware of the Beautiful Stranger"
15. "All I Ever Did"

== Credits ==
=== Musicians ===
- Pete Atkin - lead vocals, acoustic guitar
- Steve Cook - bass
- Tony Marsh - drums
- Henry Mackenzie - clarinet
- Russell Davies - tuba

=== Technical personnel ===
- Don Paul - producer
- Tom Allom - engineer
- Nick Harrison - string arrangements
