= Ronnie Cornwell =

British businessman and arms dealer (1905–1975)

- Born: Ronald Thomas Archibald Cornwell; 4 November 1905; Upper Parkstone, Dorset, England
- Died: 12 September 1975 (aged 69); Windsor, England
- Other name: Ronnie Cornwell
- Occupations: Businessman, arms dealer
- Known for: Father of John le Carré
- Spouses: Olive Glassey (m. 1928); Jean Margaret Neal (m. 1944); Joyce Aline Hooper Folland (m. 1971)
- Children: 4, (John le Carré, Charlotte Cornwell, Anthony Cornwell, and Rupert Cornwell)

Ronald Thomas Archibald Cornwell (4 November 1905 – 12 September 1975), was a British businessman and arms dealer. He left school at the age of 14. He is best known as the father of the author John le Carré.

His business dealings often skirted the edge of legality and resulted in several prison sentences. Cornwell appeared in the English press several times in connection with criminal and appeal proceedings in English courts: first in 1934, then in 1954. In 1934, he was imprisoned for six months for embezzlement and fraud.

== Early life ==
Cornwell was born in Upper Parkstone, Dorset in 1905 and left school at the age of 14.

== Career ==
In 1950 he stood as the Liberal candidate for Great Yarmouth.

The Times reported on 15 October 1954 on the “man who had set up 60 property companies” who was facing bankruptcy due to debts exceeding £1 million. The trial ended with a guilty verdict and imprisonment. Cornwell was declared bankrupt and went to prison several times.

In the 1960s, Cornwell operated as an arms dealer from London and visited East Germany several times in this capacity. He was a known short-term visitor to East Germany for the Stasi. An internal document from the Ministry for State Security, for example, records Ronald Cornwell's 24-hour stay in East Berlin on April 12, 1963. A Stasi officer noted in handwriting that Cornwell was the general representative of "Trans World Trade Ltd., Hong Kong," with an office at 25 Jermyn Street in London, and described him as divorced, approximately 175 cm tall, and stocky.

“C. is involved in arms dealing on behalf of the British government. He has ties to intelligence services. [He] is very rich. He has extensive connections. His son is a former diplomat and now lives in London as a writer, writing under the pseudonym “John le Carré.” Both father and son are politically uninterested.”

== Personal life ==
Ronald Cornwell was married to Olive Cornwell (née Glassey); their two children were Tony and David, the latter became world-famous under his pen name, John le Carré. The children grew up without a mother, and David struggled until his death with the trauma inflicted upon him by his father.

David found numerous documents in the Stasi archives detailing his father's dubious business dealings with East German authorities. In one of his last publications, John le Carré describes his father as a "con man, fantasist, and occasional jailbird" who considered reading books "unmanly" and repeatedly called his son from prisons abroad, begging for money.

With his second wife Jean (née Neal, formerly Gronow), he had two children; Charlotte, who became an actress, and Rupert, who was a British journalist connected with The Independent newspaper for thirty years.
