= Secret Drinker =

Studio album by Pete Atkin
- Released: 1974
- Studio: Morgan Studios
- Label: RCA Records
- Producer: Pete Atkin

Pete Atkin chronology
The Road of Silk (1974)	Secret Drinker (1974)	Live Libel (1975)

Secret Drinker is an album by British musician Pete Atkin, co-written by Atkin and songwriting partner Clive James. It was the penultimate album of their decade-long initial collaboration, and coincided with the rising fortunes of James as a newspaper critic and television presenter.

== Production ==
The album was recorded across 13 sessions in June and July 1974 at Morgan Studios in London. Atkin again produced, with Roger Quested as engineer. A re-recorded single version of "I See the Joker" was recorded December 1974-January 1975 at the same studio and released as a follow up to the album.

The lyrics to “Sessionman’s Blues” were written not during a music session, but during an appearance on DJ Sarah Ward’s late night show on Capital Radio. James wrote while Atkin performed with his backing band, and read him the words at the end of the show. “I See the Joker” features a recording of guitar played in reverse, an idea suggested by engineer Roger Quested. “National Steel” is a homage to an instrument owned by Atkin; the track was recorded with five microphones to capture the unique sound of the guitar as Atkin played it on the session. “Little Sammy Speedball” was the result of James acquiring a dictionary of drug terminology. The imagery of the barfly in “Secret Drinker” was inspired by the poetry of Hart Crane. “Tongue-Tied” was a retitled and slightly edited version of one of their earliest songs. It originally appeared on the private-pressed ‘’While the Music Lasts’’ in 1967, accompanied by bass player Daryl Runswick, who reprised his role for the new recording.

== Critical reception ==
Like previous releases, the album received critical acclaim despite not yielding any hit songs. John Peel praised the single "I See the Joker" as "marvelous," with others observing its more commercial appeal and dramatic musical elements.

Charles Shaar Murray, writing for NME, praised the album, singling out "Sessionman's Blues" and "Secret Drinker" as stand out tracks. Sounds noted that the album was sonically more cohesive and continued the duo's innovative approach to songwriting. Simon Frith, by contrast, criticized James' "well-wroughtness" and thought that the love songs were the better tracks, allowing Atkin to provide a more accessible emotional connection to the material.

== Track listing ==
1. "Rain-Wheels"
2. "Sessionman's Blues"
3. "I See the Joker"
4. "National Steel"
5. "Nothing Left to Say"
6. "Tenderfoot"
7. "Time and Time Again"
8. "Little Sammy Speedball"
9. "Secret Drinker"
10. "Tongue-Tied"

== Credits ==
=== Musicians ===
- Pete Atkin – vocals, acoustic guitar, keyboards
- Paul Keogh – electric guitar
- Daryl Runswick – bass guitar, double bass
- Barry Desouza – drums
- Frank Ricotti – percussion, vibraphone
- Ronnie Ross – baritone saxophone

=== Technical personnel ===
- Pete Atkin - producer, arrangements
- Roger Quested - engineering
- Pat Doyle - art direction
- Sutton Paddock Associates - design
- Fay Godwin - photography
