= Pete Atkin =

English singer-songwriter (born 1945)

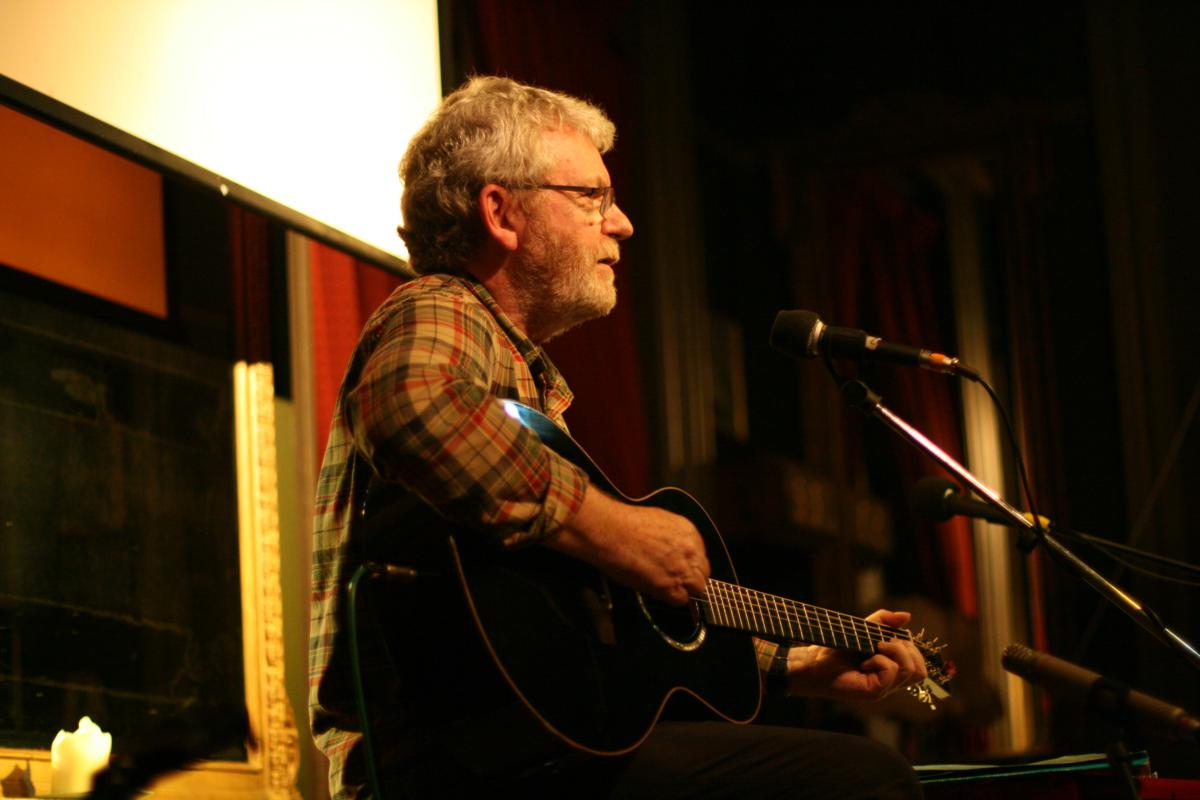
- Atkin performing in 2012

Background information
- Born: 22 August 1945 (age 80)
- Origin: Cambridge, England
- Occupations: Singer-songwriter, radio producer
- Instruments: Vocals, guitar, keyboards
- Years active: 1967–present
- Labels: EMI, Essex Music, RCA

Pete Atkin (born 22 August 1945) is a British singer-songwriter and radio producer, notable for his 1970s musical collaborations with Clive James and for producing the BBC Radio 4 series, This Sceptred Isle.

== Early life ==
Born in Cambridge, England, Atkin attended Romsey County Primary School where he began to play the violin, and subsequently attended The Perse School. He taught himself piano and guitar. In 1959, he formed a church youth club band called 'The Chevrons' for whom he played piano with four schoolfriends. He studied Classics and English at St John's College, Cambridge. In 1966 he joined Cambridge Footlights as a performer, writer and occasional music director, where he met future collaborators Julie Covington and Clive James.

== Music career ==
Atkin made his first recording in 1967: a private pressing of 160 copies of While The Music Lasts, with vocals by Atkin and fellow Footlights alum Julie Covington and songs written by Atkin solo as well as with Clive James. Next year he was taken to EMI with Julie Covington to record the most popular number from the 1967 Revue Show: the complex "Duet", which had appeared on his first album. At six minutes, it was too long to be a single and has never received commercial release; the tape has since been lost. Atkin released a second privately pressed album, consisting of 99 copies, in 1969. The Party's Moving On featured performances by Atkin and Covington and songs co-written by James.

Essex Music funded the recording of fourteen Atkin/James tracks in 1969. The producer, Don Paul, was a friend of the disc jockey Kenny Everett, who played, amongst others, the song "Master of the Revels."

In 1970, Atkin, Covington and Dai Davies recorded a series of twelve 15-minute programmes edited by James for London Weekend Television. These shows, also called The Party's Moving On, each featured three songs and were broadcast only in London late at night. They led to the commissioning of the larger revue format series What Are You Doing After The Show?. That year, Covington released several singles penned by Atkin and James, followed by the 1970 release of Atkin's first album Beware of the Beautiful Stranger. In 1971, Covington released her first album, The Beautiful Changes with the majority of songs by Atkin and James.

Atkin did, and still does, write his own lyrics, but it was the collaboration with Clive James that produced his most famous songs. Atkin and James recorded six albums in the 1970s – the last four with RCA on which label the first two were also reissued. However, despite Atkin's popularity on the college performance circuit the records did not sell in any great numbers. When singer Val Doonican recorded a cover version of the song "The Flowers and the Wine", Atkin and James joked that the royalties from that alone exceeded the total from all album sales. For Atkin, touring provided a respectable but not luxurious income.

The release of the fourth album, The Road of Silk was accompanied by a promotional tour with a backing band, in contrast to Atkin's usual solo tours. Despite the investment this implied, Atkin and James became increasingly dissatisfied with their handling by RCA. After the release of the next album Secret Drinker they had no wish to continue the relationship, and to fill their contractual obligations they concocted the album Live Libel, a collection of humour pieces which Atkin had used over the years to lighten the mood in concerts. Paradoxically this album resulted in their most successful tour to date, as James joined Atkin on stage for an evening of song, satire and poetry. James read from his epic poetic satire, The Fate of Felicity Fark in the Land of the Media while Atkin sang songs from the latest release and previous favourites.

To their dismay, the offers from other record labels did not flow in after the tour ended. Clive James returned to his blossoming career in television, while Atkin, after trying to make a living as a carpenter, responded to a 'Situation Vacant' notice from the BBC, and thus embarked on the next phase of his career.

=== Songs ===
James' lyrics were far from mainstream popular music, being frequently dense with poetic references. At their most accessible they might describe the life of a machine tool shop supervisor, as in "Carnations on the Roof". The song "My Egoist", in contrast, is translated almost entirely from a poem by Guillaume Apollinaire. Other references include Rainer Maria Rilke's Duino Elegies and William Shakespeare's sonnets.

Atkin's musical settings drew most of their inspiration from Tin Pan Alley, although in the above-mentioned "Carnations on the Roof" he set a sombre description of a working class life to themes characteristic of Tamla Motown. Often Atkin turned James' intentions upside down, as with "The Last Hill That Shows You All The Valley", which James wrote as a dirge but which Atkin set to a thumping, angry rock beat. The combination worked as James' mournful cataloguing of man's inhumanity to man became a cry of protest.

A sonnet in French by Gérard de Nerval, "El Desdichado", which begins "Je suis le ténébreux, le veuf" (roughly I am the shadowy man, the widower), inspired two separate lyrics by James, one of which was "The Shadow and the Widower", an interior dialogue reflecting on a failed romance as a man wanders home through a sterile urban landscape. The same poem, coincidentally, was set to music and performed by Flanders and Swann. A detailed breakdown of the references within this song (and several others) can be found on Atkin's website.

== Other work ==
While James became a well-known television personality and Atkin a radio producer, their music catalogue went out of print until all six original albums were re-released on CD in the 1990s.

In 1976, Atkin's recording contract with RCA expired and he concentrated on renovating his house and building furniture for other people. He also wrote columns on DIY for the UK environmentalist magazine Vole. Chris Parr of the Traverse Theatre, Edinburgh commissioned Atkin to write a musical play for their Festival season in 1977. The result was A & R, which was substantially re-written for a 1978 production by the Royal Shakespeare Company at the Donmar Warehouse in London where it ran for six months in repertory.

In 1981, Atkin succeeded Griff Rhys Jones as BBC Radio Light Entertainment Producer. He subsequently became a Script Editor in 1983 and Chief Producer, Radio 4 in 1986. His productions included Just a Minute, My Word!, My Music, Week Ending, Legal, Decent, Honest and Truthful (written by Guy Jenkin and Jon Canter, and starring Martin Jarvis), After Henry (by Simon Brett with Prunella Scales, Joan Sanderson, Ben Whitrow, and Gerry Cowper), Second Thoughts, Christopher Lee's The House, Flying The Flag, Peter Tinniswood's Uncle Mort's North Country, Jarvis's Frayn, My Grandfather, Martin Jarvis reading Richmal Crompton's Just William stories, and Yes Minister.

Atkin moved to Bristol in 1989 to be Head of BBC Network Radio there. After four years in post, he became a freelance producer in 1993. His most notable freelance production is This Sceptred Isle – a 216-part specially commissioned history of Britain, written by historian Christopher Lee and read by Anna Massey, Paul Eddington, Peter Jeffrey, and others (including Atkin himself under a pseudonym), recorded and broadcast over 14 months in 1995 and 1996. It was re-edited for release on ten BBC double cassettes and won the 1996 Talkie Award for best non-fiction, best design, and Talkie of the Year. Atkin also worked as script editor for Hat Trick Productions, as part of their sitcom and drama development team.

In 2005, Atkin provided the voice of Mr. Crock in the animated movie, Wallace & Gromit: The Curse of the Were-Rabbit. He also received a "special consultant" credit for the movie Chicken Run (2000), which was created and produced by the same studios, Aardman Animations. Both Aardman and Pete Atkin are based in Bristol. Atkin also provided some additional voices in the 2009 film, Planet 51.

Atkin also worked as a voice director on the twelfth season/C.G.I. version of Thomas the Tank Engine. Atkin has even worked on The Gruffalo films as a voice direction consultant.

== Revival ==
In 2001, 2003 and 2005, Atkin and James undertook national tours of the UK talking about, reading and singing, their songs, poetry and prose. In 2003 the duo also toured Australia. Atkin has also performed from time to time in folk clubs solo and, more recently, with the pianist and arranger Simon Wallace.

This revival dates back to 1996 when Steve Birkill, an electronics entrepreneur and satellite television pioneer, approached Atkin at a concert and asked permission to create a website celebrating his work. Atkin provided background information for this, and it was supported by a mailing list. Birkill named the list "Midnight Voices" from the lyric of the song "Payday Evening".

Birkill also invited Atkin to headline a local folk festival he supported in Monyash, Derbyshire. On the strength of Atkin's performance and the response to it, and Atkin himself realising he still had a following, this was repeated the following year, with accompanying performance CD releases by subscription. The second show also featured a tribute band, a varying cast of amateur players under the rubric of 'The Beautiful Changers'.

At the 2000 show, Atkin announced that the music conglomerate BMG, which had acquired the RCA catalogue and rights, had finally released the master recordings for the final four of his albums. They were subsequently re-released on CD in the same fashion as the first two, whose rights had been owned by a different company.

Atkin then recorded The Lakeside Sessions — a double CD of new recordings of some previously written but unrecorded Atkin/James songs. The CD Winter Spring is made up entirely of new material co-written with James. His next CD, Midnight Voices, made with Simon Wallace, consisted of reinterpretations of 15 songs originally recorded and released in the 1970s. The title is in part a tribute to the "virtual and actual group of friends and aficionados" who ran and contributed to the Midnight Voices discussion group.

In 2002, the electronic music outfit Lemon Jelly used a guitar sample from "The Pearl Driller" (from Driving Through Mythical America album) as part of the "Nice Weather For Ducks".

The Colours Of The Night, a thirteen track album of new songs, released on 6 July 2015 on the Hillside Music label, is said to "mark the final chapter in a songwriting partnership with Australian broadcaster and poet Clive James that has endured for almost fifty years". At the time of its release, James had been seriously ill with leukaemia for several years. He died in 2019.

Atkin lives in Bristol with his American wife, where he also performs as the piano/keyboard player in the Bristol-based band, The Shrinks. On 7 January 2016, Atkin was crossing the road in Bristol when he was hit in the face by a bus, suffering multiple injuries and subsequently losing the sight of one eye. However, he has since returned to performing.

In September 2023, Atkin released a second collaboration with Simon Wallace, The Luck of the Draw. The fourteen-track record included five songs from their 1970s records, two songs originally written for and recorded by Julie Covington, five from their recordings in the 2000s, including The Lakeside Sessions and Winter Spring, and two previously unreleased songs.

The "Midnight Voices" mailing list has now been replaced by an online discussion forum with multiple subject areas.

== Discography ==
=== As a performer ===
==== Solo albums ====
- Beware of the Beautiful Stranger – LP, Fontana (1970)
- Driving Through Mythical America – LP, Philips (1971)
- A King at Nightfall – LP, RCA (1973)
- The Road of Silk – LP, RCA (1974)
- Secret Drinker – LP, RCA (1974)
- Live Libel – LP, RCA (1975)
- The Lakeside Sessions, Volume 1: History & Geography – CD, Hillside Music (2001)
- The Lakeside Sessions, Volume 2: A Dream of Fair Women – CD, Hillside Music (2001)
- Winter Spring – CD, 10 new songs, Hillside Music (2003)
- Midnight Voices – CD 15 songs, Hillside Music (official release in February 2008)
- The Colours Of The Night – CD 13 songs, Hillside Music (official release in July 2015)
- The Luck of the Draw – CD 14 songs, Hillside Music (official release in September 2023)

==== Reissues ====
- Beware of the Beautiful Stranger – LP, RCA (1973)
- Driving Through Mythical America – LP, RCA (1973)
- Beware of the Beautiful Stranger / Driving Through Mythical America – 2-on-1 CD, See For Miles (1997), now deleted
- A King at Nightfall / The Road of Silk...plus – Double CD, See For Miles (2001), now deleted
- Secret Drinker / Live Libel – 2-on-1 CD, See For Miles (2001), now deleted
- The Lakeside Sessions – Double CD, Hillside Music (2002)
- Beware of the Beautiful Stranger' – CD, Edsel (2009)
- Driving Through Mythical America – CD, Edsel (2009)
- A King at Nightfall / The Road of Silk – double CD, Edsel (2009)
- Secret Drinker / Live Libel – double CD, Edsel (2009)

==== Singles ====
- Be Careful When They Offer You The Moon / Master of the Revels – 7", Philips 6006 050 (1970)
- Carnations on the Roof / Screen-Freak – 7", RCA 2329 (1973)
- Master of the Revels / Thief in the Night – 7", RCA 2416 (1973)
- The Man Who Walked Towards The Music / Senior Citizens – 7", RCA LPBO 5012 (1974)
- I See The Joker / Sessionman's Blues (both new versions) – 7", RCA 2517 (1975)

==== With the Shrinks ====
- Horfield To Hollywood – CD, (2000)
- On The Stoop – CD, (2002)
- More Damned Lies – CD, (2003)
- Further Along The Road – CD, (2006)
- Modern Sounds of Cotham & Westbury – CD, (2009)
- That's How It Looks – CD, (2012)
- Kissed by the Queen – CD, (2015)
- Our Greatest Hits – CD, (2020)

==== Compilations (Atkin only) ====
- Rider to the World's End – Cassette, RCA
- Master of the Revels – LP, RCA (1977)
- Touch Has A Memory – CD and cassette, RCA (1990)

==== Compilations (various artists) ====
- Heads Together / First Round – LP, Songwriters' Workshop sampler, Vertigo (1971)
- The Mermaid Frolics – LP, Amnesty Gala Benefit album, Polydor (1977)
- Down River Recordings: – Live Volume 1 – CD, Martin & Kingsbury (2002)
- 9 x 2 – English Contemporary Chanson – CD, Irregular Records (2002)

==== Private issues ====
- While The Music Lasts – LP, Private Issue (1967)
- The Party's Moving On – LP, Private Issue (1969)
- Pete Atkin At Monyash – CD, Private Issue (concert) (1997)

=== As a writer ===
==== Recorded music ====
- The Beautiful Changes Julie Covington – LP, Columbia (1971)
- The Beautiful Changes...plus Julie Covington, Re-issue – CD, See For Miles (1999)

==== Books ====
- A First Folio – Songs from "The Road of Silk" and "Secret Drinker" albums

==== Musicals ====
- A & R (Artist & Repertoire) – A play with songs (1977)

=== Cover versions ===
- Master of the Revels – Don Partridge
- Errant Knight – John The Fish
- The Flowers and the Wine – Val Doonican
- The Flowers and the Wine – John The Fish
- The Flowers and the Wine – Doug Ashdown
- Girl on the Train – Joe Stead
- Touch Has A Memory – Wizz Jones
- A Hill of Little Shoes – Coope Boyes and Simpson
- Touch Has A Memory – Fiona Egan
