= Karen Alexander (singer) =

American singer-songwriter

- Born: 1946 (age 79–80); Los Angeles, California, United States
- Genres: Pop rock
- Occupation: Singer-songwriter
- Instrument: Singing
- Years active: 1973–1978
- Labels: Asylum, Elektra

Karen Alexander (born 1946) is an American singer-songwriter who had some success in the 1970s.

== Early life ==
Alexander was born in Los Angeles, California, and grew up in one of the suburbs of Hollywood. Her father had a psychoanalytic practice in Beverly Hills.

== Career ==
In 1965, she married Esfandiar Bahrampour, an Iranian architect and moved to Tehran. While Karen was living in Tehran she travelled back to the U.S., now and then. On one of these trips she bought a guitar and started writing songs. As a first step in her singing career she started to sing in clubs. Although it was not done for women to sing in Iran, she continued to write songs there, and sent her tapes to America. She obtained a record contract in the early seventies, and before she recorded her first album she appeared as a backing vocalist on albums by Maria Muldaur and Wendy Waldman. Her first album was Isn't It Always Love (1975). She wrote all the songs herself, except for the title song, which was written by Karla Bonoff. Her songs had an up-tempo rhythm and entertaining lyrics.

Three years later she recorded her second and final album, Voyager. This album had a more melancholic atmosphere, and the tempo of most songs was slower than on her first album.

In Tehran she had a job at CBS Records, but as the Iranian Revolution progressed the CBS office in Tehran closed, and Alexander lost her job. Although by that time many foreigners were already leaving the country, Karen and her husband decided to stay. Eventually, the situation became too dangerous and she fled with her family in 1979. In America they moved first to Portland, Oregon, and later to Palo Alto, California.

== Discography ==
- Isn't It Always Love (1975, Asylum)
- Voyager (1978, Elektra)

== Cover versions ==
The song "A Little Bit More" from her first album was covered by The Chenille Sisters and by Julie Covington.

== Sources ==
- Bahrampour, Tara (1994) To see and see again: a life in Iran and America. New York: Farrar, Straus and Giroux.
- "Karen Alexander" — AllMusic Guide
