= The Beautiful Changes =

Studio album by Julie Covington
- Released: 1971
- Recorded: 1969–71
- Studio: Abbey Road Studios
- Label: Columbia Records
- Producer: Don Paul

Julie Covington chronology
The Party's Moving On (1969)	The Beautiful Changes (1971)	Julie Covington (1978)

The Beautiful Changes is the debut album by British performer Julie Covington, released in 1971 on Columbia Records. All songs were written by the songwriting team of Pete Atkin and Clive James, except for three tracks. Covington's previous recordings had been private releases and demos in collaboration with the two.

== Development ==
Covington, James and Atkin met at Cambridge University as members of the Footlights. In 1966, Covington answered a notice board advertisement and auditioned for a Rag Day review organized by Atkin. As James and Atkin began writing songs together, many of their tunes were written with Covington in mind. The three collaborated on the 1967 album While the Music Lasts and 1969's The Party's Moving On, both private pressings. They also produced two television series: The Party's Moving On and the longer-formatted What Are You Doing After the Show?, with Cambridge friend Russell Davies, in 1970.

== Production ==
In 1968, Covington recorded a song by Pete Atkin called "Duet" as a demo for EMI (this recording has since been lost and as a result has never been re-released). "Duet" had been popular from their Footlights reviews. On the strength of the track, which proved too long and elaborate to release as a single, EMI agreed to record "The Magic Wasn't There" as a single, and subsequently signed Covington for a full album. Producer Don Paul, familiar with the 1969 Atkin/James/Covington album, attempted to contact her, only to find she had moved and could not be located. He subsequently encountered her at an Oxford Street record shop, where she was working. Paul's friend, Kenny Everett also heard the demo of Covington singing and promised to play the single if it was produced.

The album was recorded across 11 sessions spanning 1969-71, primarily at Abbey Road Studios, supplemented by sessions at Morgan Studios and Spot Studios. Among the sessions were Atkin, Davies, as well as a slew of jazz and rock session luminaries. Recording overlapped with Atkin's first solo album Beware of the Beautiful Stranger, which shared producer Don Paul, as well as production of the two LWT series.

Columbia released two singles in 1970, ahead of the full album: "The Magic Wasn't There"/"The Way Things Ought to Be" and "Tonight Your Love is Over"/"If I Had My Time Again". "The Magic Wasn't There" proved to be the first commercial release for Covington as well as for Atkin and James.

"The Original Original Honky Tonk Night Train Blues" was an Atkin solo composition. It also appeared on 1970's Beware of the Beautiful Stranger album. Subsequently, it appeared in the 1977 television film and related album releases of The Mermaid Frolics where it was performed by Atkin and Covington with the Bowles Brothers Band.

"He Just Don't Appeal to Me" by Porter Grainger was selected by Atkin, who first heard it on a record by Ozzie Ware and the Whoopee Makers. "For Instance" was previously performed by Maggie Henderson at a Footlights show. "Don't Bother Me Now" included a 12-string guitar at Covington's suggestion. "My Silks and Fine Array", the other non Atkin/James tune, was a William Blake poem set to music by arranger Don Fraser. It was recorded at Morgan Studios with members of the band Blue Mink.

== Critical reception and legacy ==
The singles released by Columbia received significant attention, with favorable notices in the Record Mirror and others. "The Magic Wasn't There" hovered for several weeks just below the charts, but never broke into a hit. The Observer called it a "pithy ditty" and reported that if the song charted, the songwriters were set to write a musical for Covington. Such a project, as with the recording's commercial performance, did not emerge. Covington also released the Atkins/James track "Tonight Your Love is Over in 1970; the b-side, "If I Had My Time Again" was included on the album but the a-side was not, until a later re-release.

The album received muted press coverage and mixed reviews. The Daily Mirror dismissed the album, labeling Covington's voice "amateurish," while critic Dave Parry lauded it, along with the album's arrangements. Richard Williams of Melody Maker praised "many moments of great beauty", especially the title track, while criticizing the lush arrangements and uninspired production. He nonetheless encouraged people to purchase the record.

Amidst the release of the album, Covington continued working extensively in theatre, landing a part in Godspell. The success of the show led to a single, released by RCA, of the song "Day by Day', with a B-side of the Atkin/James tune "With Me it Goes Deeper". Though favorably reviewed, it did not chart and was the last studio recording of an Atkin/James song sung by Covington, who did not record another full album until 1978's Julie Covington.

The Beautiful Changes was re-released as The Beautiful Changes...Plus on the See for Miles label with two bonus tracks ("The Way Things Ought to Be" and "Tonight Your Love is Over" in 1999, and re-released on Cherry Tree in 2012 with remastered sound, a commemorative booklet but without the two bonus tracks.

== Track listing ==
All songs written by Pete Atkin and Clive James, except "He Just Don't Appeal to Me" by Porter Grainger, "The Original Honky Tonk Night Train Blues" by Pete Atkin, and "My Silks and Fine Array" by Don Fraser and William Blake.

1. "The Magic Wasn't There"
2. "Ice-Cream Man"
3. "If I Had My Time Again"
4. "He Just Don't Appeal to Me"
5. "Winter Kept Us Warm"
6. "The Beautiful Changes"
7. "Queen of Lights"
8. "For Instance"
9. "The Standards of Today"
10. "The Original Honkey Tonk Night Train Blues"
11. "Don't Bother Me Now"
12. "Friendly Island Song"
13. "My Silks and Fine Array"

== Credits ==
=== Musicians ===
- Julie Covington - vocals
- Pete Atkin - piano, guitar
- Russell Davies - trombone, tuba, vocals
- Alan Hawkshaw - organ
- Barry Morgan - drums
- Alan Parker - electric guitar
- Herbie Flowers - bass
- Clem Cattini - drums
- Tony Campo - bass
- Lyn Dobson - sitar, flute
- Steve Cook - double bass
- Mike Travis - drums
- Henry MacKenzie - clarinet
- Duncan Campbell - trumpet, flugelhorn
- Alan Franks - trumpet
- Brian Daly - acoustic guitar
- Mike Maran - piano
- Kenny Clare - drums
- Dave Bell - acoustic guitar

=== Technical personnel ===
- Nick Harrison – arrangements
- Pete Atkin – arrangements
- Don Fraser – arrangements
