= Rock Follies (soundtrack) =

Soundtrack album by Julie Covington, Rula Lenska and Charlotte Cornwell
- Released: 1976
- Recorded: January–February 1976
- Studio: Roundhouse Studios
- Genre: pop music
- Length: 37:42
- Label: Island Records (UK), Atlantic Records (US)
- Producer: Andy Mackay

Julie Covington, Rula Lenska and Charlotte Cornwell chronology
| Rock Follies (1976) | Rock Follies of '77 (1977) |

Professional ratings
Review scores
| Source | Rating |
|---|---|
| Allmusic | 4.5/5 stars |

Rock Follies is a soundtrack album of the 1976 UK television series Rock Follies. The album featured songs from the show, sung by stars Julie Covington, Charlotte Cornwell and Rula Lenska. The songs were composed by Howard Schuman and Roxy Music's Andy Mackay. The album reached No.1 in the UK album charts.

== Overview ==
The series Rock Follies was a musical drama, which centered on a singing trio and their struggles to become famous. Throughout the series, the fictional band (The Little Ladies) performed a number of songs - all original compositions. During the success of the series, an album containing 12 of the tracks was released by Island Records in the UK, and Atlantic Records in the US. It exceeded expectations by entering the charts at No.1, which was very much a rarity at the time. It remained at the top for three weeks in April 1976. Two singles were taken from the album; "Glen Miller is Missing" backed with "Talking Pictures", and "Sugar Mountain" backed with the non-album "War Brides", although neither of these charted.

The music was written by Andy Mackay, who was a founding member of Roxy Music, while the lyrics were written by Howard Schuman (who also wrote the television screenplay).

Rock Follies was re-released on Compact disc in 2000 by Virgin Records.

== Track listing ==
All tracks credited to Howard Schuman and Andy Mackay

Side One

1. "Sugar Mountain" — 2:47
2. "Good Behaviour" — 2:35
3. "Stairway" — 4:05
4. "Daddy" — 2:00
5. "Lamplight" — 3:55
6. "The Road" — 3:55

Side Two

1. "Glenn Miller is Missing" — 3:12
2. "Biba Nova" — 3:55
3. "Talking Pictures" — 2:53
4. "Hot Neon" — 3:02
5. "Roller Coaster" — 1:25
6. "Rock Follies" — 3:58

CD Bonus track:

1. "War Brides" - 2:47

== Personnel ==
- Julie Covington - lead vocals
- Charlotte Cornwell - vocals
- Rula Lenska - vocals
- Ray Russell - guitar
- Brian Chatton - keyboards
- Peter Van Hooke - percussion
- Tony Stevens - bass
- Ray Russell - string arrangements
- Robin Williams - violin solo
- Sadie McKenzie - backing vocals
- Andy Mackay - saxophone

== Charts ==
=== Weekly charts ===
| Chart (1976) | Peak position |
|---|---|
| Australian Albums (Kent Music Report) | 9 |
| New Zealand Albums (RMNZ) | 10 |
| UK Albums (OCC) | 1 |

=== Year-end charts ===
| Chart (1976–77) | Position |
|---|---|
| UK Albums (OCC) | 18 |

== Certifications and sales ==
| Region | Certification | Certified units/sales |
|---|---|---|
| United Kingdom (BPI) | Gold | 100,000^{^} |
^{^} Shipments figures based on certification alone.
