= Sue Jones-Davies =

Welsh singer and actor

- Born: 1 January 1949 (age 77); Wales
- Education: University of Bristol
- Occupations: Actress; singer; politician
- Political party: Plaid Cymru
- Spouse: Chris Langham (divorced)
- Children: 3

Sue Jones-Davies (born 1 January 1949) is a Welsh actress, singer and local politician. She played Judith Iscariot in the film Monty Python's Life of Brian (1979) and was Mayor of Aberystwyth from 2008 to 2009.

== Early life and education ==
Sue Jones-Davies was born on 1 January 1949 in Wales. She lived in Dinas Cross, Pembrokeshire. She is a graduate of the University of Bristol.

== Acting ==
Jones-Davies worked in London theatre for several years. She appeared in the original London production of Jesus Christ Superstar. Other credits include Monty Python's Life of Brian, Radio On, Rock Follies, French and Saunders, Victoria Wood As Seen On TV and Brideshead Revisited. Her role in Rock Follies of '77 earned her a chart hit single with "O.K?" in partnership with Julie Covington, Rula Lenska and Charlotte Cornwell, reaching no.10 in June 1977. In August 1976, Jones-Davies was shortlisted for the part of Leela in the long running BBC series Doctor Who, but lost out to Louise Jameson for the role.

In the 1970s, she was singer in The Bowles Brothers Band. She sings in the Welsh-language acoustic band Cusan Tan along with Annie Jones. She is also a regular performer on Welsh-language television. In 1981, she played in The Life and Times of David Lloyd George as Megan Lloyd George, the prime minister's daughter. She appeared in The Theory of Flight (1998), alongside Kenneth Branagh and Helena Bonham Carter, Solomon and Gaenor (1999) and voiced the part of Sian in animated film Y Mabinogi (2003).

== Later career ==
In 2008, she became a Plaid Cymru town councillor in Aberystwyth. Between June 2008 and May 2009, she was Mayor of Aberystwyth.

Upon taking the office, she was informed that the town had banned Life of Brian and prohibited it for nearly 30 years because of her nude scene. It subsequently emerged that although Ceredigion county councilors had reviewed the film in 1981, and found parts "quite unacceptable", they did not officially ban it. She sponsored a charity screening of Life of Brian. In July 2008, Jones-Davies was interviewed on BBC Radio Wales and BBC Radio 2 about the film and its status in Aberystwyth. She was also profiled on BBC Radio 4's Woman's Hour. The film was screened on 28 March 2009 at the Aberystwyth Arts Centre. It was attended by cast members and the co-writers of the film, Michael Palin and Terry Jones. The event was broadcast on BBC One on 12 May 2009 as a documentary titled Monty Python in Aberystwyth: A Mayor and Two Pythons.

== Personal life ==
She met the actor and writer Chris Langham, then a fellow student, whilst studying at Bristol University. They married soon after graduation and lived in London. They later separated and divorced; Jones-Davies then moved to Aberystwyth with her three sons.

== Honours ==
- Honorary Bachelor of Arts from the Aberystwyth University in 2018.
