= Rock Follies =

British TV drama series (1976–1977)

- Also known as: Rock Follies of '77
- Genre: Musical drama
- Written by: Howard Schuman
- Directed by: Brian Farnham; Jon Scoffield; Bill Hayes
- Starring: Charlotte Cornwell; Julie Covington; Rula Lenska
- Theme music composer: Andy Mackay
- Country of origin: United Kingdom
- Original language: English
- No. of series: 2
- No. of episodes: 12

Production
- Executive producer: Verity Lambert
- Producer: Andrew Brown
- Camera setup: Multi-camera
- Production company: Thames Television

Original release
- Network: ITV
- Release: 24 February 1976 – 6 December 1977

Rock Follies (together with its sequel, Rock Follies of '77) is a musical drama that was shown on British television in the 1970s. The storyline follows the ups and downs of a fictional female rock band called the Little Ladies, as they struggle for recognition and success. The series stars Rula Lenska, Charlotte Cornwell and Julie Covington as the Little Ladies, with support from Emlyn Price, Beth Porter, Sue Jones-Davies, Bob Hoskins, Stephen Moore, Derek Thompson, Denis Lawson and Little Nell among others. The series was made on a small budget for Thames Television, with a style inspired by fringe theatre. It was based on an original idea by Annabel Leventon, Diane Langton and Gaye Brown. The series was a success and won three BAFTA Awards, and the soundtrack album reached No. 1 in the UK Albums Chart. A second series with its own soundtrack album followed.

== Overview ==
The fictional band was portrayed by session musicians as well as the three lead actresses (Rula Lenska, Charlotte Cornwell and Julie Covington) who proved they could sing; the spin-off album of music from the series entered the UK Albums Chart at number one (exceptionally rare at that time). The songs were written by Andy Mackay, a founder member of Roxy Music. Lyrics and screenplay were written by Howard Schuman.

The second series, Rock Follies of '77, was a continuation of the first. Industrial action during May of that year at ITV, the commercial channel that aired the show, caused the last few episodes to be postponed until November. The second series pushed the style further in an experimental direction: where the first series had a lot of dialogue and "offstage" scenes, the second focused more on the music and fantasy sequences, with additional songs and musical interludes used to move the plot forward rather than relying on dialogue as the first had done. More sophisticated video effects were also used.

The show was a pioneer in that it was one of the first musical dramas in serial form and also featured all original songs and music. It was also unusual in portraying strong female central characters, and having an overtly feminist message. Some commentators have also pointed out that its format very much anticipates the age of the music video and MTV, being made at a time when the music video itself was in its infancy. The first series won a BAFTA Award in 1977 for Best Drama Series; Julie Covington was nominated for best actress, and Rod Stratfold and Alex Clarke were nominated for best design. The second series was nominated for seven BAFTA awards, winning two; for best lighting effects and for best camerawork in 1978.

The series first appeared in the United States in late 1976, when several episodes from series one were shown on New York City's WOR-TV as part of a "Thames on 9" programming week. Soon afterward, the first series was shown in the United States on public television and rapidly became a hit, especially in large metropolitan centres like New York and San Francisco. However, the second series was felt to be too "raunchy" for the sensibilities of a public television audience, especially as the first had received a lot of complaints from the public in areas outside the larger cities for its frank portrayal of sex, drugs and rock 'n' roll. As a result, the second series was not shown on US television until 12 years later.

Two albums of songs from the series were released. The first, named after the series, (1976), was released on Island Records in the UK and on Atlantic Records in the US in 1976. The second, covering the second series, was released on Polydor Records in both countries. Both albums were re-released on Virgin Records in 2000. The TV series is also available as a two-disc DVD set. The singles "Glenn Miller is Missing", "Sugar Mountain" (both on Island Records in 1976); and "O.K.?" (on Polydor Records in 1977) were released. The last of these became a hit and reached number 10 on the UK Singles Chart. In addition, the second album reached No.13.

Speaking in 1991, the three stars commented on the gruelling schedule while working on the series. They stated that for each episode they had to learn a minimum of five songs, as well as perform the dance routines and learn the script itself in a short period of time. Owing to this pressure, they were reluctant to do a third series, although they did say that they would like to do another series at that time, 15 years after the first. Covington said that they were paid £225 per episode.

=== Legal battle ===
An eight-week legal trial in 1982 led to a landmark ruling that Thames TV had used the idea pitched verbally a few years before the show was commissioned, by, among others, Annabel Leventon, author of The Real Rock Follies: The Great Girl Band Rip-Off of 1976. The claimants received substantial damages for breach of confidence.

== The plot ==
=== First series ===
1. "The Show Business". 24 February 1976

Three struggling actresses (Covington, Lenska, Cornwell) decide to audition for a West End-style play called Broadway Annie, a nostalgic indulgence of its director. The show flops, despite a last-ditch effort by its producer to update it and make it raunchier. The three girls, who initially do not get along and have different personalities and backgrounds, are drawn together by their shared catastrophe. The musical director of the show, Huggins (Emlyn Price) tells them they should form a rock band, with him as manager and songwriter. After some convincing, they see the possibilities, and agree. Main songs: "Stairway", "Broadway Annie", "Blueberry Hill".

2. "The Little Ladies". 2 March 1976

The band forms and starts to rehearse. Huggins seeks some financial backing from contacts he knows, but very little is forthcoming. The episode explores the home lives and relationships of the three main characters, and the widespread disapproval they face from their boyfriends (and in Dee's case, her fellow commune members). The name "The Little Ladies" is meant to be ironic - the image the band tries to project is a feisty, no-nonsense female rock act. Main songs: "Little Ladies", "Daddy".

3. "The Road". 9 March 1976

The band goes on a tour playing pubs, clubs and dive bars around provincial Britain. The band is still raw and often fails to live up to its adopted image of no-nonsense rockers, but despite this the girls realise that playing in front of an audience gives them an incredible buzz, which makes all the travelling and lack of money worthwhile. It's not all plain sailing, as in some venues they receive a very hostile reception. During this time, Anna has a brief affair with Huggins, Q meets Nigel (James Warwick), a freelance rock journalist, and Dee has an admirer in the form of Dave (Christopher Neil), an audience member who starts to follow the band. Main songs: "On the Road", "Good Behaviour", "Lamplight".

4. "The Talking Pictures". 16 March 1976

After touring comes to an end, little progress has been made. The girls' various affairs create significant fallout with their established partners, and a fair amount of hypocrisy on their partners' parts is exposed. Finances are all but gone, so through a contact of Q's, the girls end up performing in a softcore porn film. In the meantime, Q's partner Carl (Michael J. Shannon) has gone through a huge transformation from lazy layabout to cutthroat businessman; this is due to his meeting a Greek entrepreneur, Stavros (Michael Angelis), who has decided to manufacture his surfboard design. Carl talks the girls into meeting Stavros, who he thinks may be the answer to their financial problems. Anna's boyfriend Jack (Stephen Moore) is discovered in bed with one of Dee's commune girls; Anna throws him out, and he joins the commune. Main songs: "Talking Pictures", "Hot Neon", "Sugar Mountain".

5. "The Pounds Sterling". 23 March 1976

Stavros agrees to take on the girls, and they sign a contract with him. Almost immediately he changes their image to 1920s-style cabaret singers, far from their previous rock image. The girls immediately regret the decision to sign, but find they are unable to break the contract without ruining themselves. When Huggins too voices his complaints, he is sidelined; image consultants, choreographers and a new songwriter are drafted in. The girls appear as a light cabaret act at Stavros's restaurant/club, Idols. However, the place is overflowing with pretentiousness and the public are unimpressed, staying away in droves. Main songs: "Biba Nova", "Rock Follies", "Roller Coaster".

6. "The Blitz". 30 March 1976

Stavros decides that another radical change of image is called for: this time, a pastiche of The Andrews Sisters. The 1920s are out and the 1940s are in. He conceives of a new club/restaurant called The Blitz, which reproduces the London underground during the Second World War, complete with dishes including powdered eggs and bangers and mash, all bought with ration coupons. The girls dress as WAAF officers to sing their numbers on stage. Meanwhile, the commune is falling apart due to a power struggle between Jack and the original leader. In a heated argument, it turns out that despite the supposed socialistic ideals of the commune founder, he owns the property and is just another capitalist landlord. This revelation seals the fate of the commune, who are all disillusioned. At the opening night of The Blitz, there is a bomb threat and the evening is ruined. Shortly afterward, the bomb goes off and the premises are wrecked. Stavros blames his accountant for orchestrating it, as an insurance scam. Stavros's empire is in ruins, and the band find themselves back at square one. Main songs: "Glenn Miller is Missing", "War Brides", "Stairway".

=== Second series ===
1. "The Band Who Wouldn't Die". 4 May 1977

The band are on another pub tour, this time without any manager. Harry Moon (Derek Thompson), a fan and songwriter, becomes the band's new musical driving force—although now the girls are writing many of their own songs too. To make ends meet, they do a musical commercial for a range of frozen foods called "Wonder Woman", whose brand image is that of female liberation—though this comes in the consumerist form of microwave ready meals. Moon knows an established rock star called Stevie Streeter (Tim Curry), and arranges for the band to meet him with a view to becoming his support act. Streeter's act is described as "sub-Springsteen concept rock", but the reality is far worse. Streeter prevents the Little Ladies from getting any sound check or rehearsal time, resulting in their sounding abysmal on their opening tour night with Streeter. This turns out to be a standard tactic to avoid the support act from upstaging the main act. In the end, however, they manage to get their sound and act together on subsequent nights, and start to become a success. Streeter is worried that they are "taking his energy", and in a paranoid drunken rage, tries to kick them off the tour. His management, loud American Kitty Schreiber (Beth Porter) and David Maxwell (Gregory Floy), have other ideas, and after seeing the Little Ladies live, decide to sign them up as an act in their own right. Streeter is subsequently dropped, described dismissively by Schreiber: "that Jethro Tull concept crap was over five years ago". Schreiber signs the band to SM records on a standard new band contract which is far from generous. Main songs: "The Band Who Wouldn't Die", "Street Signs" (Streeter), "Struttin' Ground", "Wolf at the Door".

2. "The Empire". 11 May 1977

The newly signed band meet with Schreiber at a terrible concept restaurant called The Yankee-Doodle Club, where plans to record a single are discussed. Anna and Dee both write songs, but Dee's pop/rock song, "O.K.", is chosen over Anna's more literary effort. Thus begins a growing rivalry between the two friends. Meanwhile, Schreiber outlines her plans to her partner at SM records, revealing her boundless ambition. The band assemble at the distinctly low-rent Galaxy Studios in Camden Town to record the single, their first time in a recording studio. They are unfamiliar with the procedure and even the terminology - someone having to explain that "cans" mean headphones. Q is also terrified of the ordeal ahead. After the band lay down all their tracks, it is the girls' turn to perform the vocals. There are a lot of problems getting the sound level correct in "the cans", leading to an exasperating series of errors and mis-takes. In a clever sequence, as the girls finally get their act together, their private thoughts are revealed as alternative lyrics to the track they are recording. However, eventually it starts to come together and they begin to enjoy themselves. At the end of the session Anna and Q leave, and Dee is deliberately delayed. She is asked to re-record Anna's harmonies, since they feel she is the better singer. She doesn't like to betray her friend, but in the end reluctantly agrees. Nothing is said about this to Anna later. Anna is left to write the B-side, a song called "B-side", which she performs in a fantasy sequence on a huge 'SM records' logo. It is clear that the SM is meant to also indicate Servant/Master and Sadism/Masochism. Finally the single is ready, and they preview it; Anna gradually starts to notice that it is Dee doing the harmonies and not her, and begins to feel increasingly sidelined and betrayed. Main songs: "O.K.", "B-Side", "In My Cans".

3. "The Hype". 18 May 1977

The new single is ready to be released, and Schreiber's hype machine kicks into action. There are T-shirts, badges, caps and even a set of Little Ladies dolls. The band embark on a nationwide promotion tour by InterCity train, accompanied by various freeloaders from the music press and radio stations. In a series of interviews, the distance between the liberated ladies and the distinctly unliberated mainstream media is highlighted: one interviewer insists on repeatedly asking Dee whether she has a "steady boyfriend", while other interviewers are more concerned with showing off their own grasp of the music business than actually finding out what the Little Ladies are about. The band also play a few small venues as part of the promo tour, including The Aggro Club, a venue newly dedicated to the emerging punk rock. Naturally the girls do not go down too well here. Things are not going well, but eventually they play a gig at Cardiff University, which is well received and reminds them that some gigs make the rest of the business worth it. There they meet another pub rock band, Rox and Rawls, and Dee is invited to sing an impromptu number with Rox (Sue Jones-Davies), which works out well. Dee sees Rox as a kindred spirit, getting back to the essence of what rock music is supposed to be about. Schreiber and Maxwell discuss whether the band are worth keeping on: it is a close-run thing but Schreiber decides to press on for now. Main songs: "The Hype", "Outlaws", "Roll Your Own", "Round One".

4. "The Loony Tunes". 22 November 1977*

The single flops. Anna decides to try and blame this on the fact that her harmonies had been redone by Dee, something that Q had not realised. Anna writes a new song, "Loose Change", and since the band "owes" her she is given more space to develop it and sing lead - it is very wordy and not terribly good. Meanwhile, Kitty strikes a deal with obnoxious entrepreneur Johnny Britten (Bob Hoskins) for them to become the nightly house band at the Electric Empire, Britten's Watford club. The fact that Dee is clearly the best singer in the band becomes evident when, for Anna's song, she performs backing vocals with Q - Kitty subsequently changes the lineup so that Dee sings the main vocal, and things sound much better. However, Anna's ego suffers a blow and this starts to cause the beginnings of her resentment (and her paranoia). Anna hooks up with The Angel (Trevor Ward), a Jamaican, and starts to smoke dope. As the house band at the Empire, they finally start to get an appreciative audience for the music they really want to sing — rock. However, all the girls start to feel they are being manipulated by Kitty and are losing control. Dee confronts Kitty, who makes no bones about it: she has ambitions, and to fulfill them the band must adapt to her vision, or forever remain playing the pubs and clubs. Soon Kitty suggests that the band needs more power, and eventually Dee reluctantly agrees to see it her way. They decide that another main singer is needed, and Dee suggests Rox, the Welsh pub singer she met in Cardiff. Rox is brought down to discuss the idea and Kitty is impressed. For Rox, it is an opportunity for stardom, and she readily goes along with it. Rox is signed, and can't believe her luck. Anna and Q are not involved in the discussions, and become convinced that they are to be dropped from the band. The addition of Rox comes as a complete surprise. Q is quite positive about the change, but Anna is wholly unimpressed. Main songs: "The Loony Tunes", "Loose Change", "The Things You Have To Do", "Money on the Wall".

5. "The Divorce". 29 November 1977

As Anna is drawn more toward Angel, she is also drawn more and more toward drugs. In time, this leads to total paranoia, especially wherever Rox is concerned. Although Kitty tries to pass Rox off as a balance in the vocals, Anna sees her as a threat. She tries to express this to both Dee and Q. Dee doesn't see it that way, and Q is afraid to be the deciding vote. As her unrest grows, Anna tells the group that she wants a divorce, thereby ending the original Little Ladies. Main songs: "Rock Follies of '77", "Territory", "Woman is Mystery".

6. "The Real Life". 6 December 1977

With Anna out of the group, Q realizes that her vocals are far too weak, especially when compared to Dee and Rox. At first she just fades into the background, but then she too decides it is time to leave the Little Ladies. At first Q goes into a deep depression, but the sudden appearance of her oft-married mother gets her back on track. Meanwhile, Dee visits Anna who, with Angel, has opened a small R&B club. Anna refuses to return to the Little Ladies, and Dee is left feeling guilty about the break-up. She reasons that it was for the good of the group. Not even impending stardom and a tour of the United States (and an appearance at Madison Square Garden) assuage her guilty feelings. With Rox, the Little Ladies take off and become a sensation. Even Q, no longer with the group, is happy for them. But, just before their appearance at Madison Square Garden, Dee has a vision while singing "Welcome to the Real Life" where it is just her, Anna and Q — The Little Ladies. Main songs: "Jubilee", "Waiting for Waves", "Little Ladies", "The Real Life".

* NOTE - A two-hour recap episode was screened on 21 November 1977 following the strike. This was a compilation of the first three episodes of Series Two.

== Cast ==
- Rula Lenska as Nancy "Q" Cunard de Longchamps (series 1 & 2)
- Julie Covington as Devonia "Dee" Rhoades (series 1 & 2)
- Charlotte Cornwell as Anna Wynd (series 1 & 2)
- Sue Jones-Davies as Rox (singer with pub band Rox and Rawls, series 2)
- Emlyn Price as Derek Huggins (manager and songwriter, series 1)
- James Warwick as Nigel (freelance reporter for Rolling Stone, series 1)
- Christopher Neil as Dave (lover of Dee and friend of Nigel, series 1)
- Michael Angelis as Stavros (entrepreneur and club owner, series 1)
- Vivienne Burgess as Mrs. Wynd (Anna's mother, series 1)
- Angela Bruce as Gloria (member of Dee's commune, series 1)
- Billy Murray as Spike (Dee's boyfriend and commune member, series 1 & 2)
- Michael J. Shannon as Carl (Q's American boyfriend, series 1)
- Stephen Moore as Jack (Anna's boyfriend, series 1)
- Bill Stewart as Bob (commune member, series 1)
- David Dixon as Rob Fury (record producer, series 1)
- Simon Jones as Juan (pretentious waiter in restaurant/club, series 1)
- Beth Porter as Kitty Schreiber (manager and businesswoman, series 2)
- Gregory Floy as David Maxwell (co-owner of SM records with Schreiber, series 2)
- Derek Thompson as Harry Moon (songwriter and mentor, series 2)
- Denis Lawson as Ken Church (Harry's partner & activist, series 2)
- "Little" Nell Campbell as Sandra (Schreiber's assistant, series 2)
- Sam Dale as Rawls (singer with pub band Rox and Rawls, series 2)
- Bob Hoskins as Johnny (friend of Kitty, series 2)
- Trevor Ward as The Angel (series 2)
- Tim Curry as Stevie Streeter (series 2)

David Dixon also appears in the first series as a record company A&R man, but is uncredited. However, this was amended with the release of the DVD, where he was credited. Dixon, Simon Jones, Stephen Moore and Beth Porter all later had roles in the TV adaptation of The Hitchhiker's Guide to the Galaxy.

== Soundtrack albums ==
- 1976 Rock Follies (UK No. 1, AUS No. 9)
- 1977 Rock Follies of '77 (UK No. 13)

== Stage adaptation ==
A musical based on the TV series was staged at the Minerva Theatre in Chichester, from 24 July to 26 August 2023, from a book by Chloe Moss and directed by Dominic Cooke. The cast comprises Samuel Barnett, Carly Bawden, Tamsin Carroll, Fred Haig and Zizi Strallen.

The creative team also includes Nigel Lilley as musical supervisor, arranger, and co-orchestrator, Toby Higgins as musical director and co-orchestrator. Carrie-Anne Ingrouille as choreographer, Vicki Mortimer as set designer, Kinnetia Isidore as costume designer, Paule Constable as Lighting designer, Ian Dickinson for Autograph as Sound designer.
