= Rupert Cornwell =

British journalist

Rupert Howard Cornwell (22 February 1946 – 31 March 2017) was a British journalist connected with The Independent newspaper for thirty years.

== Early life and education ==
Born to Ronnie Cornwell and Jeanie Gronow (née Neal) in 1946 Marylebone, London, he was educated at Winchester College, and read Greek at Magdalen College, Oxford.

== Career ==
Cornwell worked in advertising following graduation. He began his career in journalism with Reuters in 1968. Cornwell was sent to the Brussels branch office, where he met his first wife, interpreter Angela Doria. They moved to Paris, where Cornwell joined the Financial Times as a foreign correspondent. From France, Cornwell and Doria moved to Rome, and Bonn. Cornwell was the first Moscow correspondent of The Independent, from its launch in 1986. During this time, he won two British Press Awards. Later in his career, Cornwell served as the Chief US Commentator at The Independent newspaper.

His book God's Banker, about Roberto Calvi, an Italian banker found hanging from Blackfriars Bridge, was published in 1983.

== Personal life ==
Cornwell was the half-brother of Anthony Cornwell and John le Carré (born David Cornwell), and the full brother of the actress Charlotte Cornwell.

His first marriage, in 1972, was to European Parliament interpreter Angela Doria; they had a son, Sean (born 1974). In 1988, he married Susan Smith, whom he had met while in Bonn. They had a son, Stas.

Rupert Cornwell died, aged 71, on 31 March 2017 at Sibley Memorial Hospital in Washington D.C. from cancer.
