= Live Libel =

Studio album by Pete Atkin
- Released: 1975
- Studio: Rockfield Studios
- Label: RCA Records
- Producer: Pete Atkin

Pete Atkin chronology
Secret Drinker (1974)	Live Libel (1975)	Winter Spring (2003)

Live Libel is an album by British musician Pete Atkin, co-written by Atkin and songwriting partner Clive James. It was their final album under the RCA contract and unintentionally concluded their 1970s songwriting collaboration.

== Production ==
The album was recorded across ten sessions in March and May 1975, at Rockfield Studios in Wales and Morgan Studios in London. It was produced by Pete Atkin, with engineers Dave Charles at Rockfield and Roger Quested at Morgan.

Atkin and James had prepared a full set of songs for their next album, but frustration over the label's neglect of their previous LPs motivated them to set those songs aside in favor of the material that came to comprise Live Libel. Atkin described it as a "contractual fulfillment album." The tracks consisted of comedic songs that Atkin often inserted into his live concerts to add variety. The two were versed in comedy, having first begun collaborating as part of Footlights. On Live Libel, they lampooned the song stylings of a variety of other artists, including Kris Kristofferson, Steeleye Span and Leonard Cohen.

All songs were written by Atkin and James except "Ballad of an Upstairs Window", written by Atkin alone prior to working with James. Popular at revues, the song introduced James to Atkin's talents when he first heard him sing it at Cambridge nearly ten years prior. The song later appeared on their first record, 1967's privately-release While the Music Lasts.

To support the album release, Atkin and James embarked upon a tour together, comprising songs and spoken word. At the conclusion of the tour and their RCA contract, they anticipated new offers of recording contracts. No such offers emerged. Gradually, they stopped writing songs together, until the rise of the internet facilitated a reconnection with their fans. They began collaborating again and released their next album of new material, Winter Spring, in 2003.

== Critical reception ==
Amidst a successful tour and strong sales, the album received a mixed critical reception. NME appreciated the songs' satirical bent but doubted the album's commercial potential. Colin Irwin, writing for Melody Maker, acknowledged the writers' talents but considered the album to be a failure, musically and lyrically, hindered by a music industry rife with low-hanging fruit. "This album is mostly dumb," he concluded. Sounds was more favorable, hoping for more comedic work from Atkin and James, but acknowledging that the album fell short, including in terms of Atkin's vocal mimicry. The Stage and The Daily Telegraph were similarly tepid.

== Track listing ==
1. "Song for Rita"
2. "Black Funk Rex"
3. "I'm Crazy Over You"
4. "Errant Knight
5. "Ready for the Road"
6. "Why?"
7. "Ballad of an Upstairs Window"
8. "Stranger in Town"
9. "Rattlesnake Rock"
10. "Doom from a Room"
11. "I've Got Better Things to Do"
12. "Lonesome Levis Lane"
13. "Sheer Quivering Genius"
14. "Uncle Sea-Bird"

== Credits ==
=== Musicians ===
- Pete Atkin – vocals, pianos, acoustic guitars
- Clive James - lead vocals on "Why?"
- Neil Campbell – electric guitars, Spanish guitars
- Dick Levens – bass guitar
- Jeff Seopardie – drums, percussion
- Daryl Runswick – double bass
- Rock Bottom (Gaye Brown, Diane Langton and Annabel Leventon) – backing vocals
- Strings led by John Mayer

=== Technical personnel ===
- Pete Atkin - production, arrangements
- Dave Charles - engineer
- Roger Quested - engineer, remixing
- Trog - cover illustration
- John Cross - design
- Pat Doyle - art direction
