= Russell Davies =

British journalist and broadcaster

- Born: Robert Russell Davies; 5 April 1946 (age 80); Barmouth, Wales
- Education: Manchester Grammar School; St John's College, Cambridge
- Occupations: Journalist; broadcaster

Robert Russell Davies (born 5 April 1946) is a British journalist and broadcaster.

== Early life, family and education ==
Davies was born in Barmouth, North Wales. According to him, his grandfather was a mole-catcher. He attended Manchester Grammar School. During his time at MGS (1957–64), he acted in dramatic society productions and was appointed school vice-captain.

He gained a scholarship to St John's College, Cambridge, and was awarded a first-class degree in Modern and Mediaeval Languages in 1967. He soon abandoned his post-graduate studies in German literature when the opportunity arose to tour with the Cambridge Footlights revue. During his time in Cambridge, he contributed topical cartoons to the news pages of Varsity, the undergraduate newspaper, under the pseudonym Dai.

== Career ==
=== Early performance ===
In 1970, Davies co-starred with fellow Footlights alumni Pete Atkin, Clive James and Julie Covington across three London Weekend Television series: The Party's Moving On, What Are You Doing After the Show? (both revue-style shows featuring original music by Atkin and James, along with sketches and commentary), and Think Twice, which focused on arts discussion between Davies and co-host Clive James. He also appeared as a musician on Atkin's debut album Beware of the Beautiful Stranger (playing tuba) and Covington's debut album The Beautiful Changes (playing tuba and trumpet).

Also in 1970, Davies co-starred in the BBC comedy series Don't Ask Us alongside Richard Stilgoe and Maureen Lipman.

=== Journalism and writing ===
Feeling limited by a string of early comedy acting roles offered by his agent, Davies transitioned into writing and presenting. He became a film and television critic for The Observer and The Sunday Times, and contributed features and sports columns for The Daily Telegraph and The Sunday Telegraph. He also provided caricatures for The Times Literary Supplement and served as a deputy editor of Punch.

Davies edited Kenneth Williams's diaries and letters for publication, despite being the frequent target of Williams's sharp criticism in those same diaries.

=== Broadcasting ===
During the 1980s, Davies appeared regularly on television presenting Saturday Review for BBC2. In 1988, he presented Radio Fun, a 12-part BBC radio series chronicling the history of radio comedy from the 1930s to the 1980s (repeated on BBC Radio 7 / BBC Radio 4 Extra from 2007 to 2010).

Davies is an accomplished jazz trombonist and has written and presented numerous documentaries on jazz and popular song. In 1999, he presented Jazz Century, a year-long weekly history of the genre for BBC Radio 3. He wrote and hosted the BBC Radio 4 language series Word of Mouth (which won the European Radio Premios ONDAS prize in 1996), as well as Legends of Light Music, a BBC Radio 2 series examining the songwriting partnership of Rodgers and Hart. On television, he wrote and presented the 2003 BBC Four documentary film Quest for Perfection, exploring the life of bandleader and clarinetist Artie Shaw (produced by John Warburton and shortlisted for the 2004 Grierson Award), followed by a 2006 BBC documentary on the cartoonist Ronald Searle.

Davies has had a long association with radio panel and music programmes. From 1998 (succeeding Benny Green) until September 2013, he hosted The Russell Davies Song Show on BBC Radio 2, showcasing the Great American Songbook and pre-rock popular song. He has also chaired the BBC Radio 4 music quiz Counterpoint. Davies began presenting Radio 4's Brain of Britain initially as a temporary replacement during the illness of Robert Robinson, taking over permanently following Robinson's retirement in 2010.

== Bibliography ==
- Vicky (1987) with Liz Ottaway
- Ronald Searle (1990)
- Foreign Body - the Secret Life of Robert Maxwell (1995)
- Brain of Britain: Ultimate Quiz Book (2017)

== See also ==
- Edward Pygge, a pseudonym used by Davies
