= Anthony Cornwell =

English cricketer

Anthony Cornwall
Personal information
- Full name: Anthony Ewart Frank Cornwell
- Born: 19 August 1929; Parkstone, Dorset, England
- Died: 27 August 2017 (aged 88)
- Batting: Right-handed
- Bowling: Right-arm fast-medium

Domestic team information
- Years: Team
- 1947–1950: Dorset
- 1949: Free Foresters

Career statistics
Competition	First-class
Matches	1
Runs scored	0
Batting average	0.00
100s/50s	0/0
Top score	0
Balls bowled	96
Wickets	3
Bowling average	20.00
5 wickets in innings	0
10 wickets in match	0
Best bowling	3/60
Catches/stumpings	3/–
- Source: Cricinfo, 1 June 2011

Anthony Ewart Frank Cornwell (19 August 1929 – 26 August 2017) was an English cricketer. Cornwell was a right-handed batsman who bowled right-arm fast-medium.

He was born in Parkstone, Dorset and educated at Radley College and Pembroke College, Cambridge.

Cornwell made his debut for Dorset in the 1947 Minor Counties Championship against Wiltshire. He played 2 further Minor Counties Championship matches in 1950, against Berkshire and Oxfordshire. He made a single first-class match for the Free Foresters against Oxford University in 1949. In this match he was dismissed for a duck twice, by George Chesterton in the Free Foresters first-innings, and by future South Africa Test player Clive van Ryneveld in their second. He took 3 wickets in the match, all coming in the Oxford University first-innings for the cost of 60 runs from 16 overs.

He later worked as an advertising executive, including as creative director for a New York firm, and lived in the Seattle metropolitan area at Lynnwood, Washington, United States, where he died.

He was the elder brother of David Cornwell, known as writer John le Carré, and the elder half-brother of journalist Rupert Cornwell and actress Charlotte Cornwell.
