= Julie Covington =

British singer and actress (born 1946)

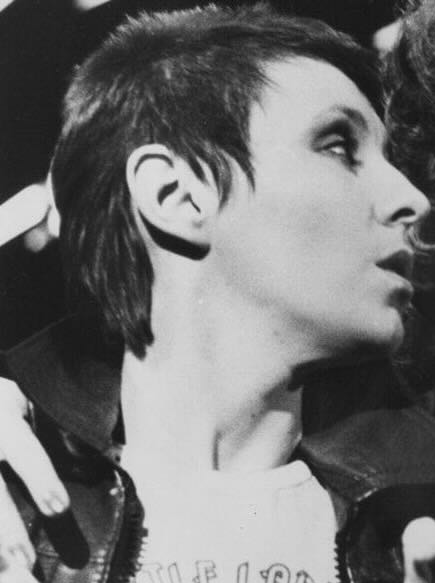
- Covington in Rock Follies (1977)

Background information
- Born: 11 September 1946 (age 80); London, England
- Genre: Pop
- Occupations: Singer; actress
- Instrument: Vocals
- Years active: 1967–present
- Label: Virgin

Julie Covington (born 11 September 1946) is an English singer and actress, best known for recording the original version of "Don't Cry for Me Argentina", which she sang on the 1976 concept album Evita.

== Early life ==
Julie Covington was born in London. Her parents were Ernest Gladden and Elsie Gladden (née Moody). Her parents divorced and her mother married Leslie Covington in 1957. She attended the girls' grammar school Brondesbury and Kilburn High School in Kilburn, northwest London, then studied at Homerton College, Cambridge. She started acting at school, and performed both acting and singing at two Edinburgh festivals. She won the first Edinburgh Festival Fringe Best Actress Award.

== Career ==
Covington started singing songs written by Pete Atkin and Clive James after joining the Footlights while still at teachers' training college in Cambridge. She toured North America with the Oxford and Cambridge Shakespeare Company and appeared on stage in numerous Footlights related programmes. She also collaborated with Atkin and James on two private-press recordings. In 1967, she was invited to sing on David Frost's television show. The strength of her recordings secured Atkin, James and Covington, along with frequent collaborator Russell Davies, two television programmes for London Weekend Television: The Party's Moving On and What Are You Doing After the Show?. As record producer Don Paul was developing Pete Atkin's first solo album, he pitched Covington to Columbia Records, which agreed to fund a series of well-received singles, followed by Covington's first professionally-released album, The Beautiful Changes in 1971.

In 1971, she was cast in the original London production of Godspell at The Roundhouse, alongside David Essex, Jeremy Irons and Marti Webb. A recording of the production, featuring Covington's lead vocal on the track "Day by Day", was released in 1972. This was followed by a role in the hit Australian comedy film, The Adventures of Barry McKenzie. She was then cast as Janet Weiss in the original production of The Rocky Horror Show in 1973. Between 1974 and 1984 Covington appeared regularly in the companies of the National Theatre and the Royal Court Theatre, creating such roles as Alice in Plenty, Vivienne Eliot in Tom & Viv (for which she received an Olivier Award nomination) and Edward in the original production of Caryl Churchill's Cloud Nine.

During the early 1970s she appeared in and sang in the children's television programme Play Away. She starred in the BBC's 1975 Christmas production Great Big Groovy Horse, a rock opera based on the story of the Trojan Horse, shown on BBC2. (It was repeated on BBC1 in 1977.) 1976 and 1977 saw her appearing in both series of the primetime British television musical drama Rock Follies. For this she was nominated for the British Academy Television Award for Best Actress. In 1976, the composer Andrew Lloyd Webber saw her perform in cabaret, and recognising her from Rock Follies, suggested to lyricist Tim Rice that she might be the actress to play the title role in their original studio recording of their musical Evita. The singer Elkie Brooks had previously turned down an offer.

Covington's recording of the song "Don't Cry for Me Argentina" reached No. 1 in the UK Singles Chart in February 1977. Later offered the opportunity to originate the role in the stage production of Evita, she declined, which led to Elaine Paige being cast. Speaking in 1985, Covington expressed some regret at this decision, but explained that she did not like Eva Perón and that without some positive feeling for the person she preferred to turn the role down.

As Evita opened in 1978, she instead appeared with the English National Opera as Anna in The Seven Deadly Sins. Paige's successor in Evita, Marti Webb, later also played Anna in the ENO's production of The Seven Deadly Sins.

In 1978, Covington performed the role of Beth, wife of Parson Nathaniel (Phil Lynott), on the recording of "The Spirit of Man" from Jeff Wayne's Musical Version of The War of the Worlds.

Covington achieved chart success with a cover version of Alice Cooper's "Only Women Bleed", which reached No. 12 on the UK Singles Chart. It is included on reissues of her eponymous 1978 album.

After recording a second solo album and guesting on other artists' albums, she returned to the theatre, starring in the 1982 National Theatre production of Guys and Dolls, playing Sister Sarah opposite Ian Charleson's Sky Masterson. Russell Davies said that her performance "is of such a special timbre that she isn't easily matched."

In 1989 she took part in a British television special with Colm Wilkinson, Carol Woods and Paul Jones called Let's Face the Music of Lennon and McCartney. Her solo performances of "If I Fell" and "In My Life" are available on YouTube.

== Albums ==
=== Solo albums ===
- While the Music Lasts (1967)
- The Party's Moving On (1969)
- The Beautiful Changes (1971)
- Julie Covington (1978)
- The Beautiful Changes Plus (1999)
- Julie Covington Plus (2000)

=== Cast recordings and soundtracks ===
- Godspell: Original London Cast Recording (1972)
- The Adventures of Barry McKenzie (1972)
- The Rocky Horror Show (1973)
- Hey You! Songs from Play Away (1975)
- Evita: An Opera Based on the life of Eva Peron (1919–1952) (1976; re-released 1996)
- Rock Follies (1976)
- The Mermaid Frolics (1977) – benefit for Amnesty International
- Rock Follies of '77 (1977)
- Jeff Wayne's Musical Version of The War of the Worlds (1978; remastered 2005)
- Guys and Dolls: National Cast Recording (1982)
- The Wildcliffe Bird (audio book) (1991)
- Guys and Dolls (1992)

== Singles ==
Year	Single	Chart positions	
Year	Single	UK	AUS
1970	"The Magic Wasn't There"	—	—
1972	"Day by Day"	—	—
1973	"Two Worlds Apart" (Demo only)	—	—
1976	"Don't Cry for Me Argentina"	1	1
1977	"OK?" (with Rula Lenska, Charlotte Cornwell, Sue Jones-Davies)	10	—
1977	"Only Women Bleed"	12	—
1978	"(I Want to See the) Bright Lights"	—	58
1982	"Housewives' Choice"	—	—
"—" denotes releases that did not chart.

== Awards ==
- Britannia Awards 1977 – "Best British Female Newcomer"
