= Charlotte Cornwell =

English actress (1949–2021)

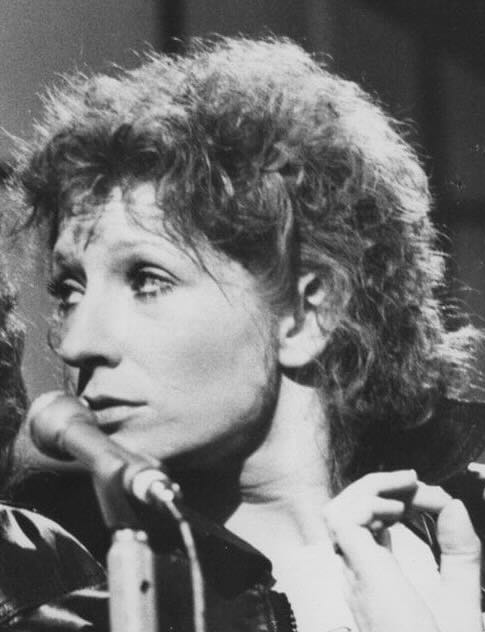
- Cornwell in Rock Follies (1977)
- Born: 26 April 1949; Marylebone, London, England
- Died: 16 January 2021 (aged 71)
- Occupation: Actress
- Years active: 1971–2016
- Partner: Kenneth Cranham
- Children: 2
- Relatives: Rupert Cornwell (brother); Anthony Cornwell (half-brother); John le Carré (half-brother)

Charlotte Cornwell (26 April 1949 – 16 January 2021) was an English actress, singer, and a teacher of acting on the faculty at the University of Southern California (2003–2012).

Cornwell began her career as an actress, making her debut for Richard Cottrell's Cambridge Theatre Company in November 1971 as Miss Brewster in Arthur Wing Pinero's Trelawny of the 'Wells'. before joining Val May's Bristol Old Vic Theatre Company where she performed in a wide variety of productions from 1972 through 1975. In 1974 she made her screen debut as Sally Potter in the musical film Stardust. She rose to fame for her portrayal of the drug-addicted rock star Anna Wynd in the television drama Rock Follies (1976) in which she was part of a musical trio which also included Julie Covington as Dee and Rula Lenska as Q. The music the three women recorded for this television drama was released as a soundtrack album which reached number 1 on the UK Albums Chart.

Afterwards, Cornwell remained active as an actress in both British and American film, television, and the theatre up until her retirement in 2016. She was a member of the Royal Shakespeare Company from 1977-1980 and in 2013.

== Early life and education ==
Born in Marylebone, London, Cornwell was the daughter of Ronald Cornwell and Jean (nee Neal, formerly Gronow). Her father was a con artist who had served terms in prison for fraud and obtaining money under false pretences. Her brother was the British journalist Rupert Cornwell. She had two half-brothers from her father's first marriage, the cricketer Anthony Cornwell and the MI6 agent David Cornwell who wrote spy novels under the name John le Carré.

Charlotte credited her brother David with suggesting she pursue a career as an actress, and at his prompting, she auditioned and earned a place at the Webber Douglas Academy of Dramatic Art (WDADA) in London. David later based the main female character in his 1983 spy novel, The Little Drummer Girl—an English actress called "Charlie"—on Charlotte. In an interview, Cornwell described David as "the best brother a girl could have".

In 1970 Cornwell portrayed Dolly Levi in the WDADA's production of Hello Dolly!, which earned her first positive critical reviews. The Stage wrote in their review of the production, "Hello Dolly! not only upheld this excellent tradition but in some ways surpassed previous productions. This was in part due to the exceptional talents of Charlotte Cornwell, who played Miss. Dolly Gallagher Levi. She has an excellent voice and an unusual ability to sing equally well in several different styles according to the mood and situation of the character." The performance was followed by the role of Beauty in the WDADA's 1971 production of Peter Ustinov's The Love of Four Colonels at the Chanticleer Theatre, London.

== Acting career ==
After completing her education at the WDADA, Cornwell began her career as an actress, making her debut for Richard Cottrell's Cambridge Theatre Company in November 1971 as Miss Brewster in Arthur Wing Pinero's Trelawny of the 'Wells'. before joining Val May's Bristol Old Vic Theatre Company in 1972. She remained a member of the Bristol Old Vic Company through to 1975, playing a broad range of roles from Kate Hotspur in Shakespeare's Henry IV to Becky in Sam Shepard's The Tooth of Crime and Queen Elizabeth I in Robert Bolt's Vivat! Vivat Regina!. Particular critical attention was given to her portrayal of Florence Nightingale in the company's 1973 revival of Edward Bond's controversial play Early Morning in which the company restored previously legally banned lesbian love scenes between Nightingale and Queen Victoria; the latter part played by Elizabeth Power.

While working at the Bristol Old Vic, Cornwell made her screen debut in the small role of Sally Potter in the 1974 musical film Stardust. That same year she portrayed Diana Lake in Terence Rattigan's French Without Tears at the Royal Lyceum Theatre in Scotland. In 1975 she performed the role of Cecily in Oscar Wilde's The Importance of Being Earnest at the Greenwich Theatre.

In 1976 Cornwell rose to fame for her portrayal of the drug addicted rock star Anna Wynd in the BAFTA Award winning television drama Rock Follies (1976) in which she was part of a musical trio which also included Julie Covington as Dee and Rula Lenska as Q. The music the three women recorded for this television drama was released as a soundtrack album which reached number 1 on the UK Albums Chart. The women reprised their roles the following year in Rock Follies of '77.

Cornwell was a member of the Royal Shakespeare Company from 1977-1980 during which time her roles including Rosalind in As You Like It and Beatrice in Much Ado About Nothing. She worked as an actress with the Royal National Theatre from 1984. She worked extensively both in the West End and at fringe venues, and appeared in the United States in several productions, including Richard III and An Enemy of the People opposite Sir Ian McKellen, Athol Fugard's The Road to Mecca, Terence McNally's Master Class, Stephen Sondheim's A Little Night Music (San Francisco Bay Critics' Award), and Alan Bennett's The History Boys at the Ahmanson Theatre in Los Angeles. In a return to staged Shakespeare, in Summer 2016 she was the Chorus in the Regent's Park production of Henry V.

Among her film appearances were roles in Stardust (1974), The Brute (1977), The Krays (1990), The Russia House (1990), White Hunter Black Heart (1990), The Saint (1997), Ghosts of Mars (2001) and Dead Space: Aftermath (voiceover, 2010).

Cornwell worked extensively on television including series lead roles in Rock Follies (1976–77) and No Excuses (1983), and appearances in The Men's Room, The Governor, Shalom Salaam, Shoestring, Lovejoy, Love Hurts, Where the Heart Is, A Touch of Frost, Silent Witness, The Mentalist, Dressing for Breakfast, Capital City, The West Wing, Casualty, The Practice, New Tricks, Toast of London, and Midsomer Murders, among other television programmes in Britain and the United States. She taught at the University of Southern California School of Dramatic Arts from 2004 to 2012, and returned to resume her acting career in the UK in June 2012.

Cornwell won a libel action against the journalist Nina Myskow and The Sunday People in December 1985. A jury at the High Court awarded her £10,000 in damages after Myskow, in an article for the newspaper, had referred to Cornwell as someone unattractive, middle-aged and whose "bum is too big". The verdict was upheld on appeal, but Cornwell ended up £70,000 out of pocket from legal costs. However, the award for damages was raised to £11,500.

== Personal life ==
Cornwell had a daughter, Nancy Cranham, from a past relationship with actor Kenneth Cranham.

=== Death ===
She died from cancer on 16 January 2021, at the age of 71.
