= Dave Laing =

English writer, editor, and broadcaster (1947–2019)

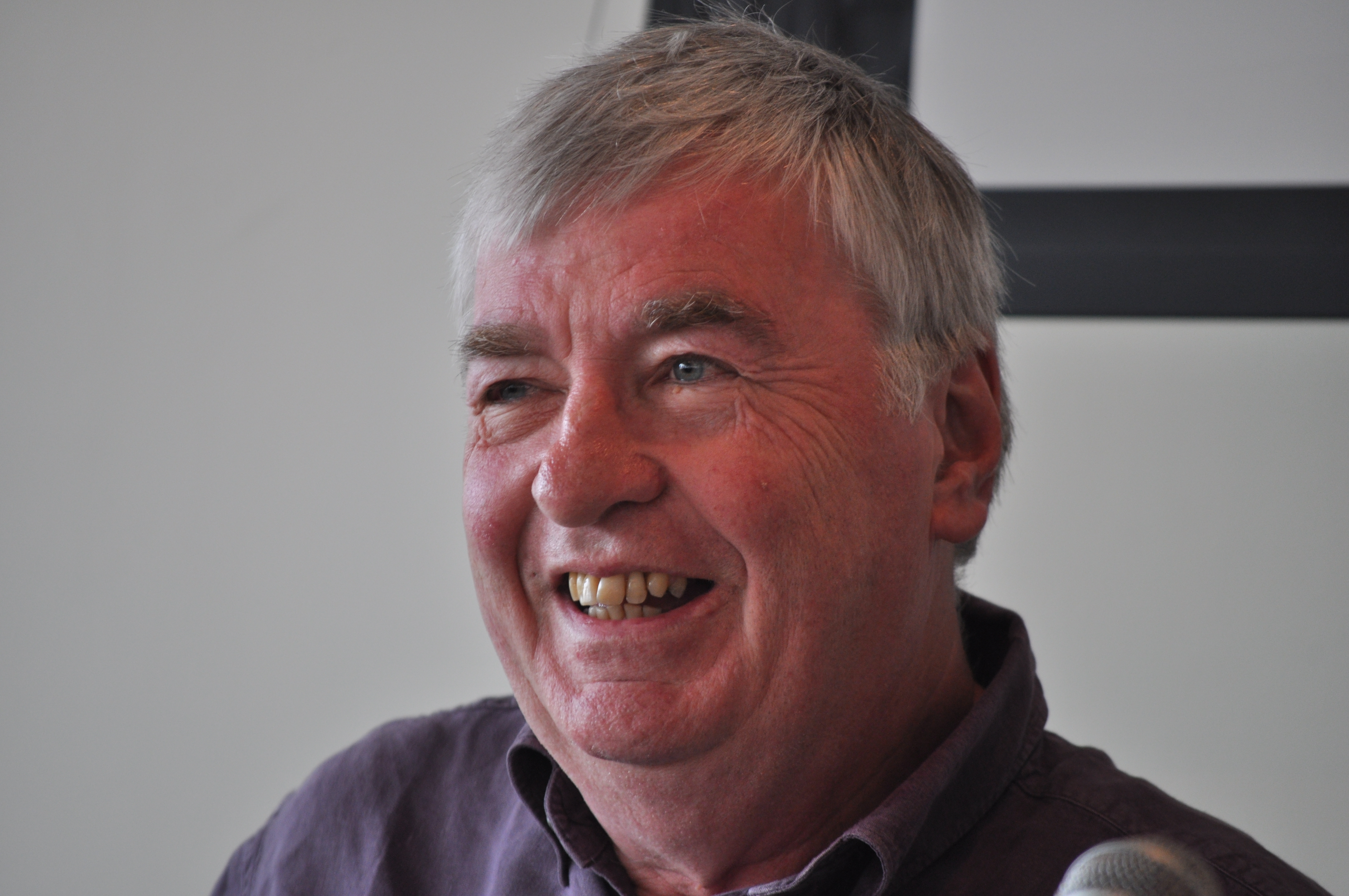
- Laing in 2012
- Born: David William Laing; 9 January 1947; Tunbridge Wells, Kent, England
- Died: 7 January 2019 (aged 71)
- Education: King's College School; St Catharine's College, Cambridge (left without graduating); University of Sussex
- Occupations: Music journalist, author, editor

David William Laing (9 January 1947 – 7 January 2019) was an English writer, editor, and broadcaster, specialising in the history and development of pop and rock music. He was a research fellow at the universities of Westminster and Liverpool.

== Biography ==
Laing was born in Tunbridge Wells, Kent, and attended King's College School in Wimbledon, where he joined his first band. He began studies at St Catharine's College, Cambridge, but left in 1967 without graduating and moved to London. He started writing music articles and his first book, The Sound of Our Time (1970), while working in clerical jobs. He then took a degree in English and sociology at the University of Sussex, where he met fellow writer Phil Hardy. Laing also worked with photographer and writer Val Wilmer on an unpublished history of coal-mining communities.

In 1971, Laing published one of the first extended analyses of a pop musician's recordings, Buddy Holly. At the suggestion of writer Charlie Gillett, Laing became editor of the monthly British music magazine Let It Rock, from October 1972 to October 1973. His other books include The Electric Muse: the story of Folk into Rock (with Karl Dallas, Robin Denselow and Robert Shelton, 1975), and One Chord Wonders: Power and Meaning in Punk Rock (1985). In the mid-1970s, Laing was co-editor of one of the first reference books on rock music, The Encyclopedia of Rock. In 1978, he published The Marxist Theory of Art, written after moving to Hebden Bridge in Yorkshire.

Laing co-authored, with Phil Hardy, The Faber Companion to 20th Century Popular Music (1995), and co-wrote, with Sarah Davis, The Guerrilla Guide to the Music Business (2001). Laing was an editor of the Continuum Encyclopedia of Popular Music of the World. He also wrote widely in music magazines and newspapers, including The Guardian. As of 2016, he was the managing editor of the journal Popular Music History and co-editor of the Icons of Pop Music book series.

Laing died of cancer on 7 January 2019, at the age of 71.
